= National Gallery of Kosovo =

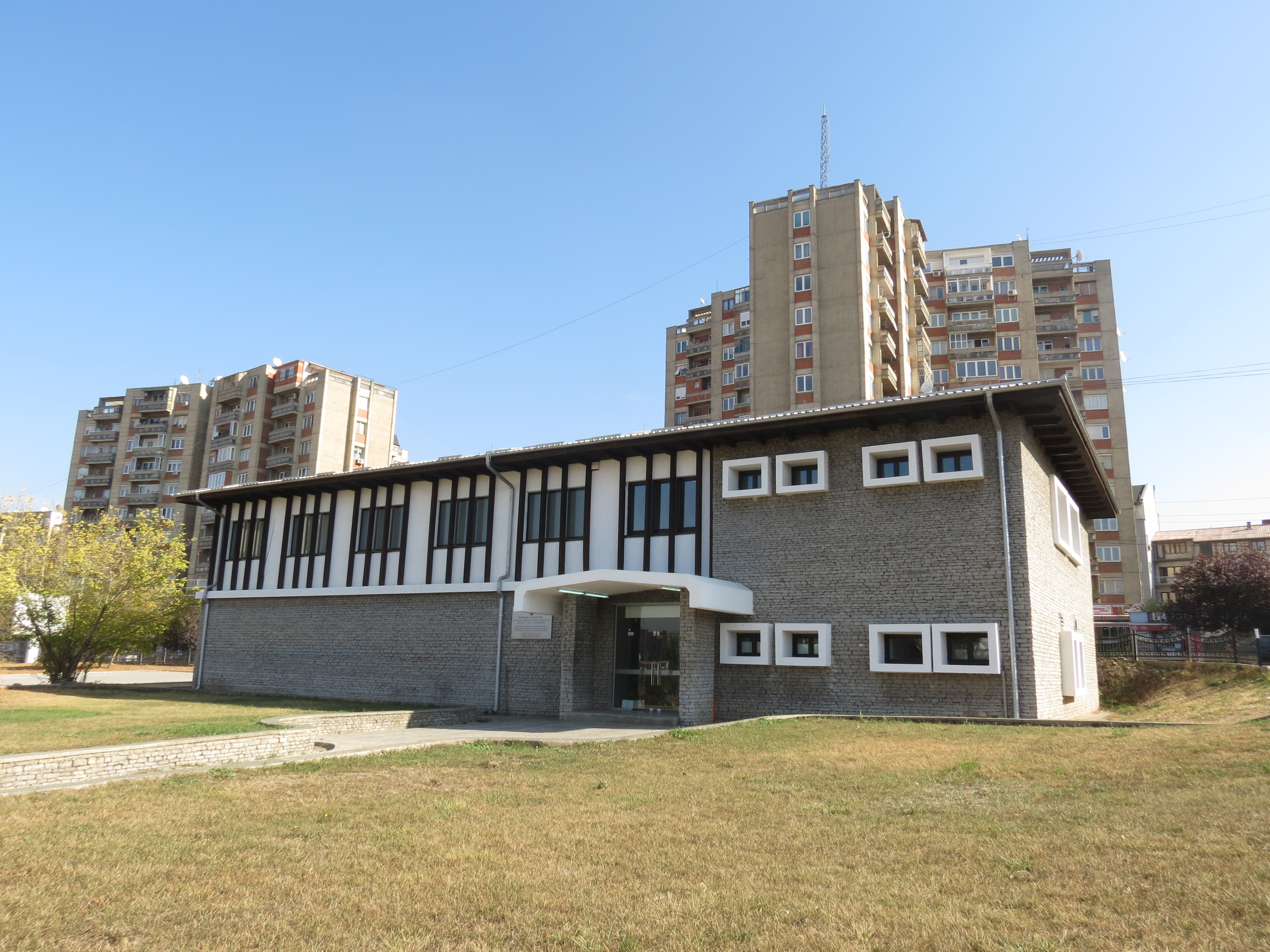
- National Gallery of Kosovo (NGK)
- Former name: Kosova National Art Gallery (KNAG)
- Established: February 1979
- Location: Agim Ramadani 60, 10000, Pristina, Kosovo
- Coordinates: 42.6571°N 21.1640°E
- Type: Art museum
- Collection size: 896 artworks
- Director: Arta Agani
- Owners: Ministry of Culture, Youth and Sport
- Public transit access: Bus lines: 3A, 5, 7, 7A, 10; Bus Map Pristina
- Website: www.galeriakombetare-rks.com

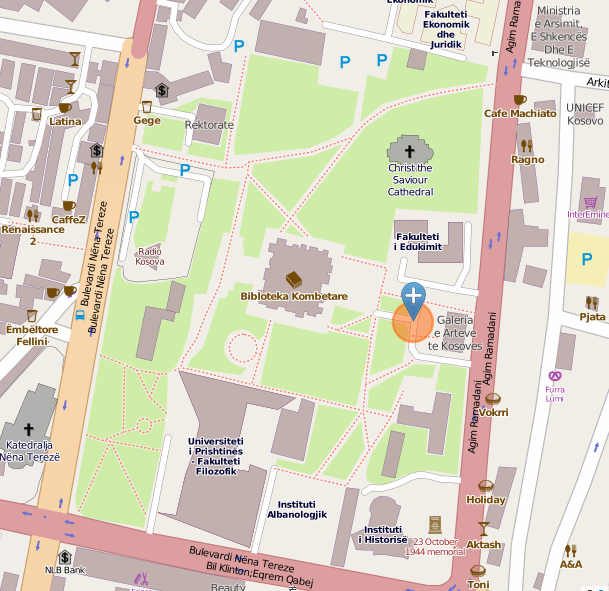
Location of KNAG in Pristina, Kosova

The Kosovo National Art Gallery logo

The National Gallery of Kosovo (NGK; Albanian: Galeria Kombëtare e Kosovës), formerly known as the Kosova National Art Gallery (KNAG; Albanian: Galeria Kombëtare e Arteve e Kosovës), is an art gallery situated at the University of Pristina Campus that focuses on 20th-century art.

Previous exhibits have included the International Exhibition of Photography "Gjon Mili" and the "Muslim Mulliqi" International Contemporary Art Exhibition.

The Kosovo National Gallery has published books, catalogues, brochures and two monographs: "Kosova Contemporary Art" and "Kosova Feniks".

== History ==
=== Early usage ===
The Kosova National Art Gallery was built in 1935 using stone bricks as a military barracks building of the Yugoslavian Army. From 1955–1981 it operated as a library, and from 1982-1983, it was adapted into an exhibition hall by the architect Agush Beqiri, to be used by the Revolutionary Museum. It was officially adapted into what is now the Kosova National Art Gallery in 1995.

=== Foundation ===
The Kosova National Art Gallery was established in 1979 as a cultural institution to present visual arts, and to preserve and collect valuable works of art. It is named after the Kosovar artist, Muslim Mulliqi. The Gallery was established as a way to visually present Kosovar culture, as the only art institutions before it were the Art High School in Pejë in 1949, the Higher Pedagogical School in Pristina, and the Academy of Arts (founded in 1973). Nearly 500 of them are currently active in the fields of painting, sculpture, graphic and applicative arts.

Kosovar art remained relatively unknown internationally due to political restrictions that limited opportunities for artists to exhibit in formal galleries. Despite these restrictions, Kosovar artists found alternative means to showcase their work. However, during the Kosovo War, many studios were burned down and many artworks were lost.

Until 1990, Kosovar artists presented their art in centres around the world. They were notable because of their distinct approach to the arts, owing to the economic and social circumstances in which they were created.

In the decade following the war, the Kosovo Art Gallery organized more than 200 collective and individual exhibitions from national as well as international artists. Thousands of artists have exhibited their works, which were visited by hundreds of thousands of art lovers.

=== Architecture ===
The Kosova National Art Gallery's facade was made from stone from the area of Pejë, which gave it an appearance distinct from the surrounding architexture. The building where the gallery is currently situated was once the seat of the museum of the 1941–1945 war.

== Muslim Mulliqi ==
Muslim Mulliqi was one of the first and most important impressionist and expressionist painters of Kosovo and Albania. He was born into a family of artists in Gjakova in 1934. He attended the Academy of Fine Arts in Belgrade, studying under the well-known Serbian artist Zora Petrović. He finished his postgraduate studies by the same professor in 1961.

Mulliqi was a professor at the Faculty of Arts in the University of Pristina. He acted as founder and vice-president of the Academy of Sciences of Kosovo. He died in Pristina in 1998.

Mulliqi exhibited his artwork in Kosovo, Poland, Hungary, Italy, Germany, Norway, Finland, India, Canada, and Egypt.

His artwork has been used on stamps by the Kosova Postal Service.

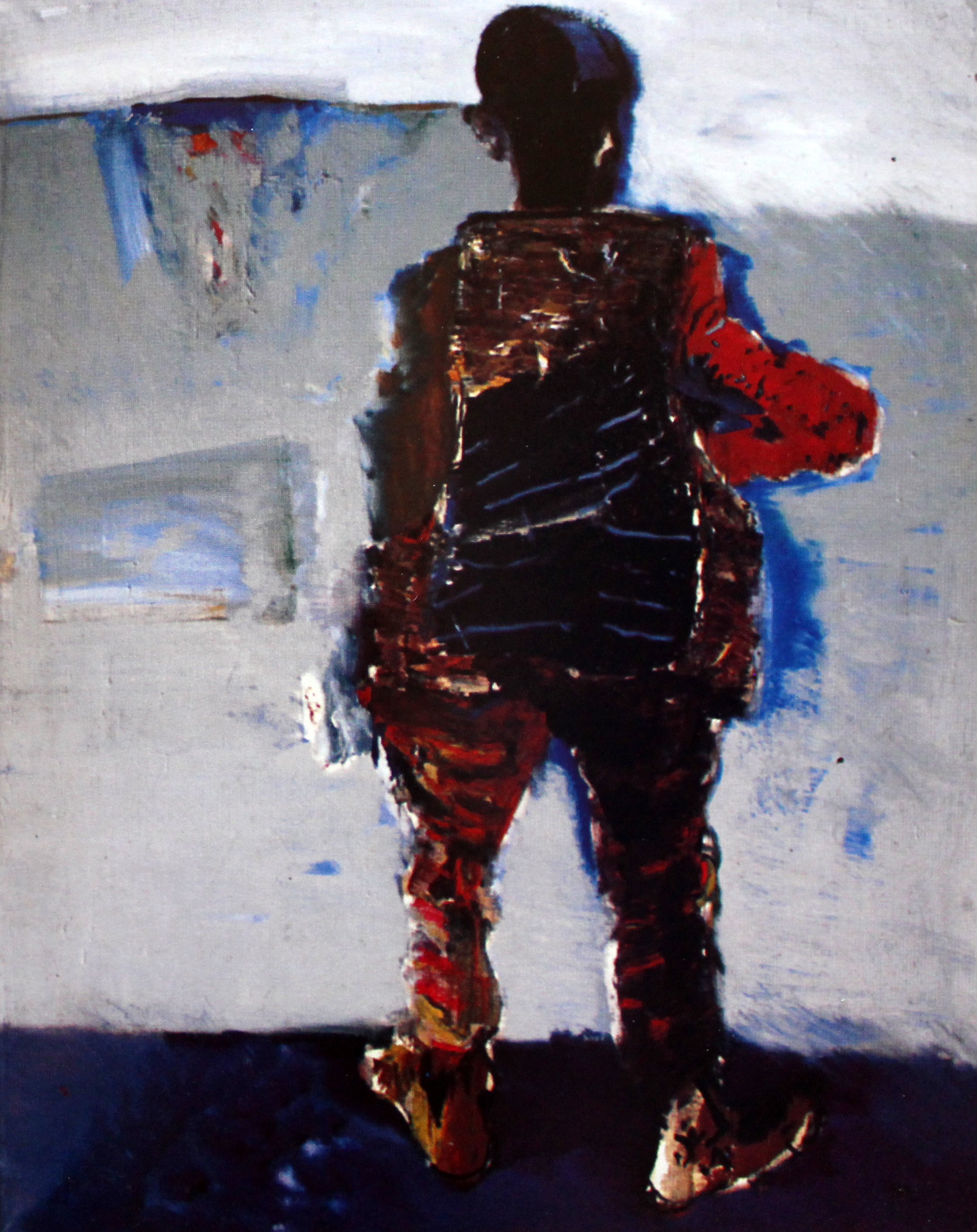
Hamall, oil on canvas, 120 × 150 cm, 1967

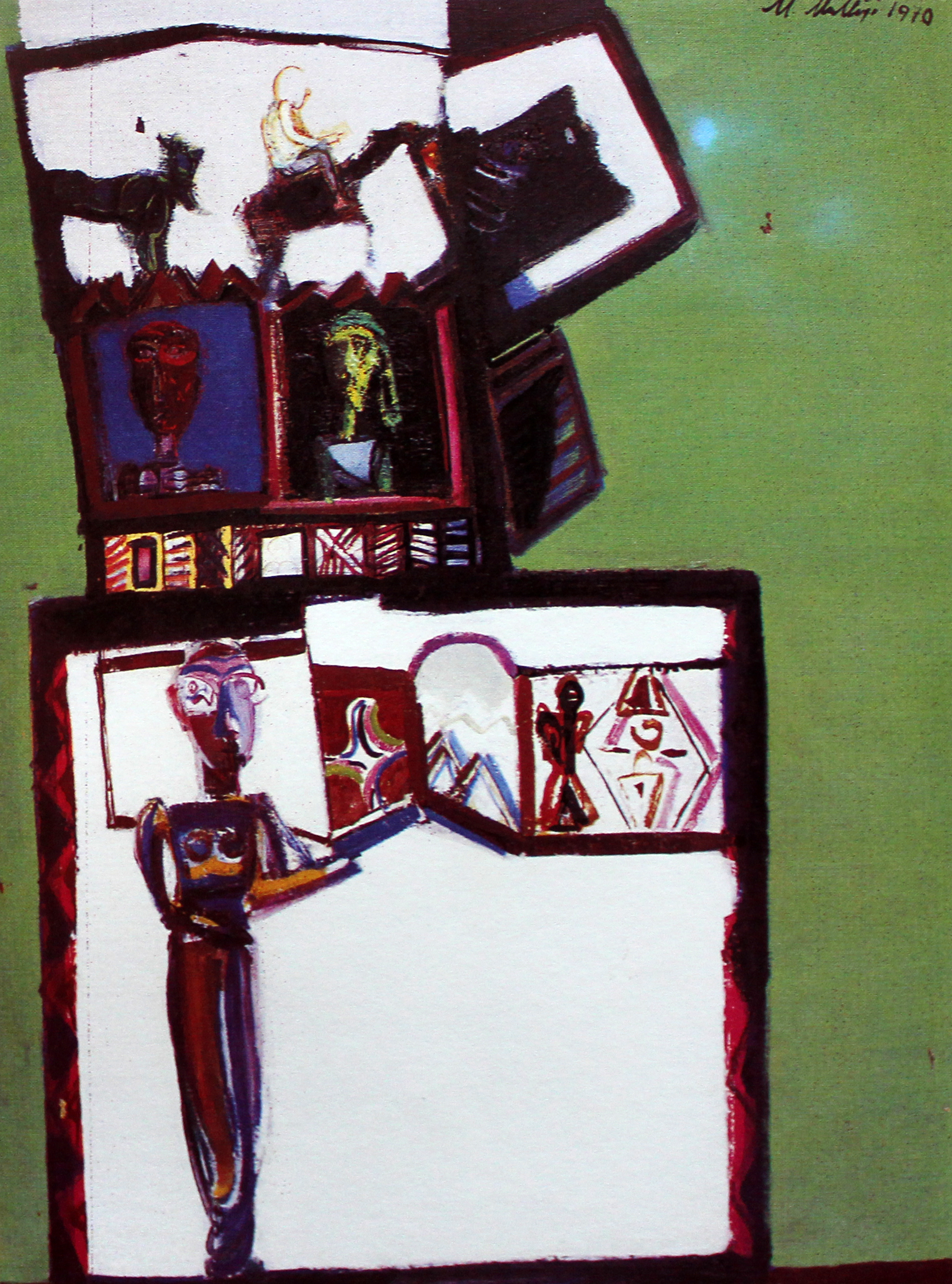
Motif from Prizren, oil on canvas, 124 × 100 cm, 1970

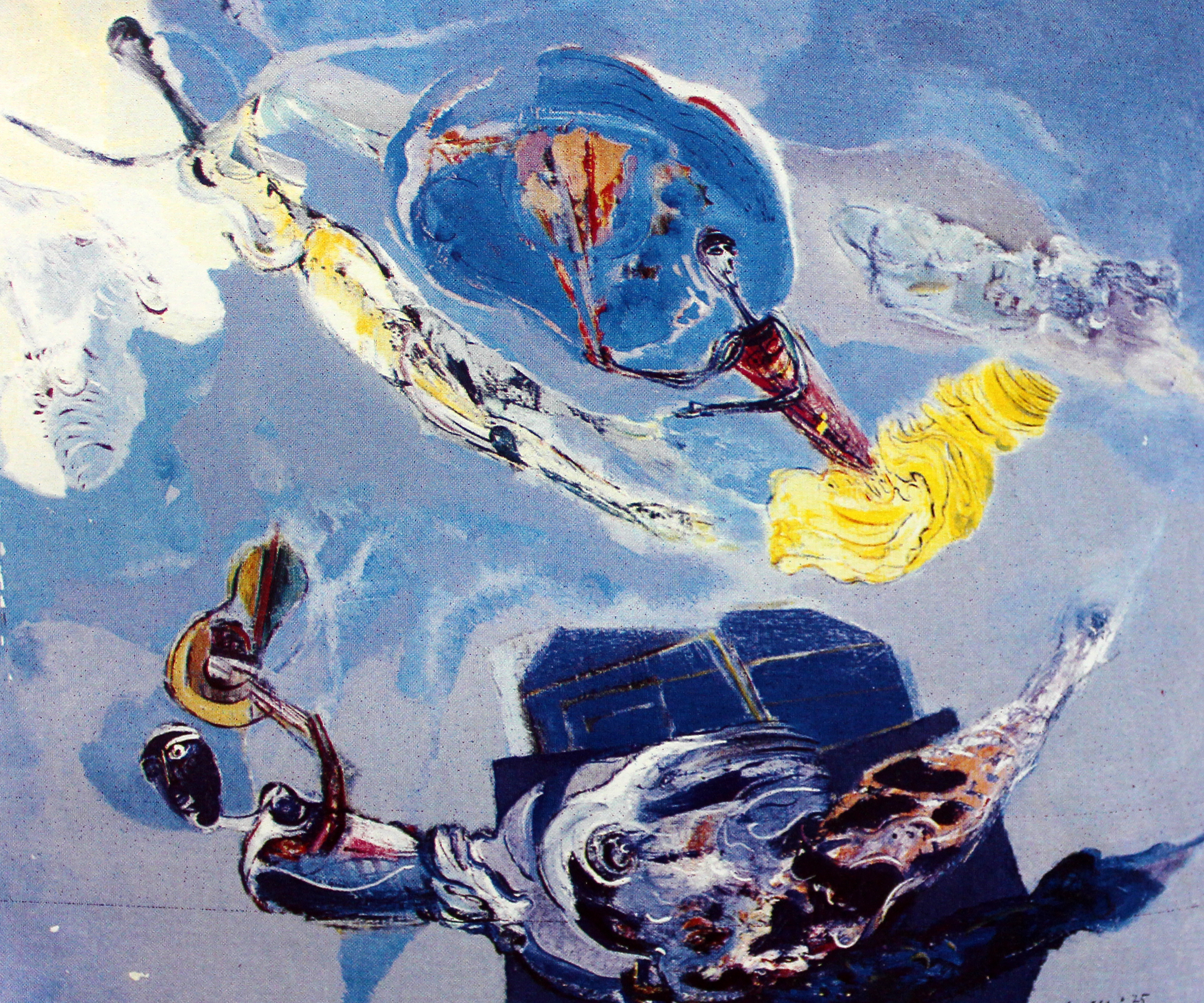
Journey to the sky, oil on canvas, 107 × 132, 1977

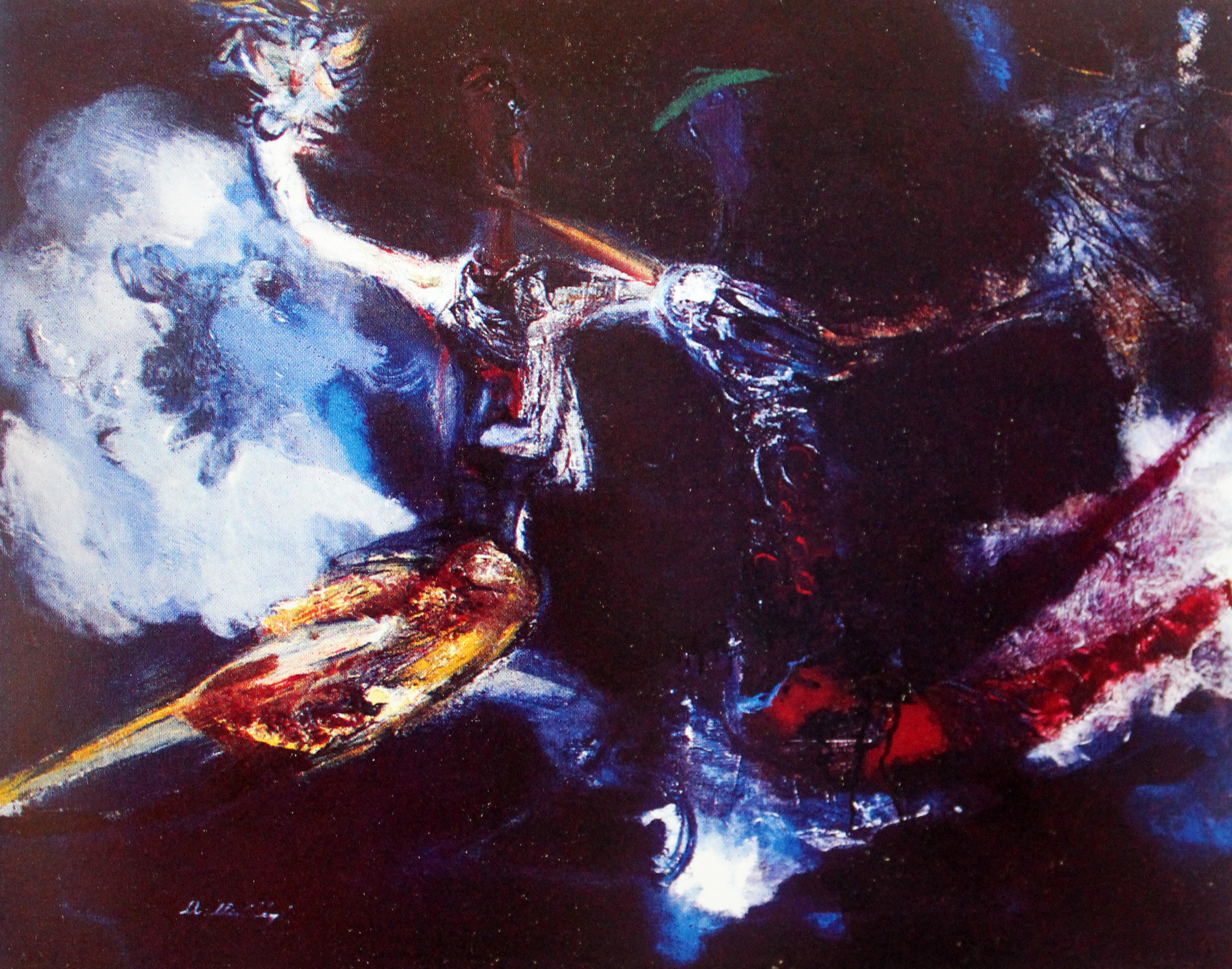
Asking new spaces, oil on canvas, 94 × 121 cm, 1977

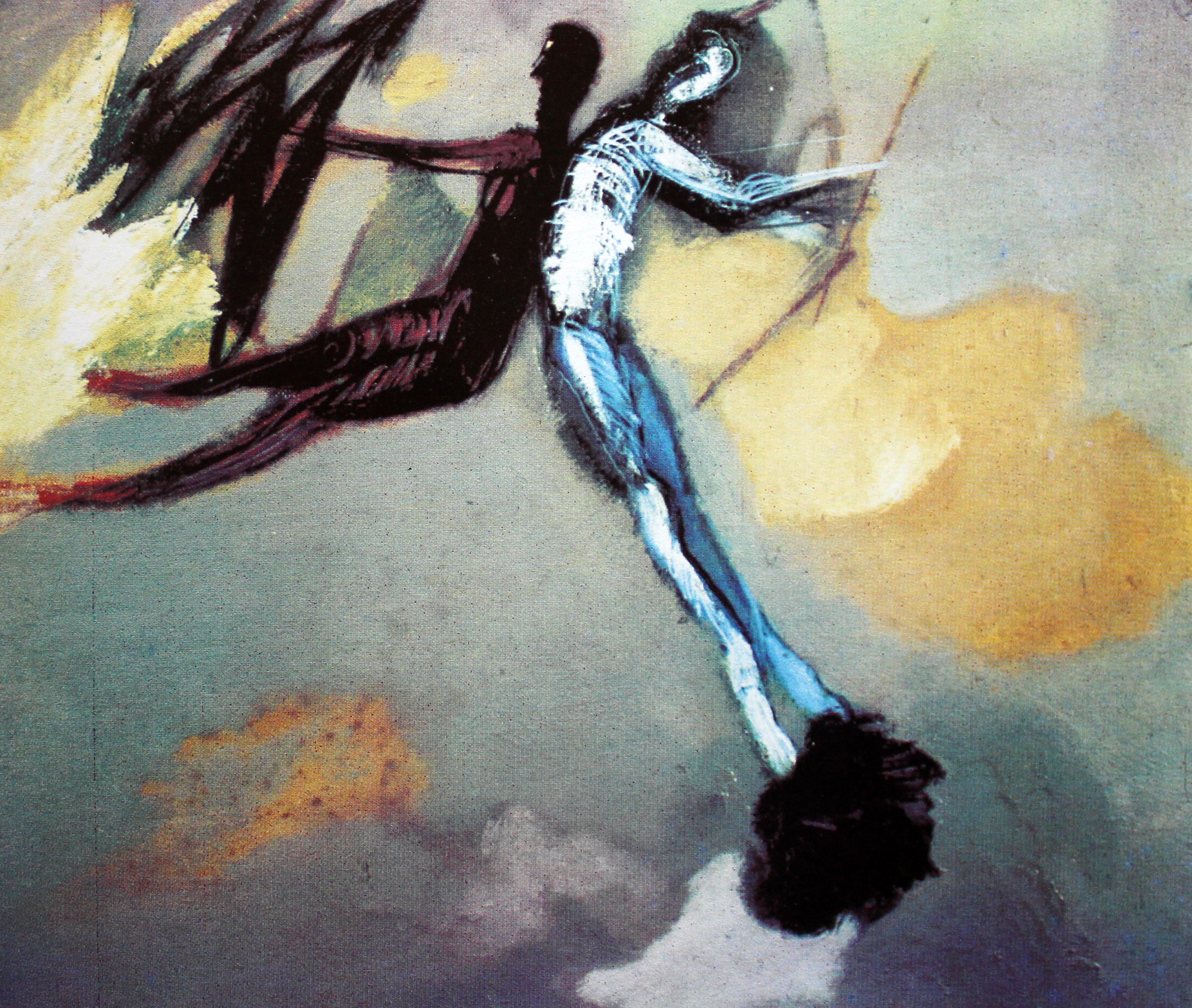
The air meeting, oil on canvas, 50 × 40 cm, 1975

== Cooperation ==
As a result of cooperation between the Ministry of Culture Youth and Sports of Pristina, which is charge of the Gallery, and international institutions, the Gallery has hosted numerous guests from Albania and other neighboring states.

Many Serbian, Montenegrin, and Turkish artists also contributed to the development of Kosovar visual art. Vlada Radović, Milorad-Musa Miketić, Veljko Radović, and Svetozar Kamenović are notable for enabling other creative generations through their pedagogical work. Also noteworthy are the sculptor Svertomir Arsić-Basara, graphic artist Zoran Jovanović, painters Hilmija Qatoviq, Fevzi Tufekci, and Zoran Karalaić, who also worked in the Arts University in Pristina.

The Kosova National Art Gallery has created cooperation between:

- National Gallery of Art of Albania in Tirana
- European Cultural Parliament,
- International Committee of Museums and Collections of Modern and Contemporary Art (ICOM)
- Pavilion of Venice Biennale
- Kosova Embassy in Washington

== Competitions ==
=== Artist of Tomorrow Award XI ===
This program was initiated by Wendy W. Luers, founder and director of Foundation for a Civil Society in the United States. This competition is organised in many places of South East Europe, where the ceremonies of the Award traditionally continue. The award in Kosova was first organized in 2002 from the Kosova National Art Gallery in cooperation with the American Embassy.

The winner of the exhibition is rewarded by a six-week residency at the International Curatorial Studios Program in New York. The residency gives the winner an opportunity to build an international professional network.

Originally held in 1991 in Czechoslovakia, this competition started attracting attention from many other countries in Europe. It started in Kosovo in 2002, and is now held in more than ten countries.

This is the only competition of its kind, and gives the winners the chance to create contacts and relations with people in their field.

Anyone under the age of 35 can apply. The winners are chosen by a panel of experts, and all finalists may exhibit their artwork at the KNAG. The prize is a six-week stay in an international studio in New York City as well as a curatorial program, and has been so for eleven years.

Past winners include:

- 2002 - Tahar Alemdar
- 2003 - Jakup Ferri
- 2005 - Kader Muzaqi
- 2006 - Fitore Isufi-Koja
- 2007 - Fatmir Mustafa-Carlo
- 2008 - Bekim Gllogu
- 2009 - Miranda Thaçi
- 2010 - Loreta Ukshini
- 2011 - Astrit Ismaili
- 2012 - Majlinda Hoxha
- 2013 - Artan Hajrullahu

Artan Hajrullahu was born in 1979 in Kosovo. He completed his bachelor's and master's degrees at the Faculty of Arts in Pristina, at the Department of Painting. His drawings are delicate and they create a poetic story where human relationships and house objects take an important role. Hajrullahu teaches painting at the Secondary School of Visual Arts in Gjilan.

=== Gjon Milli Prize Photography Exhibition ===
This biannual exhibition was first held in 2001, as an initiative of the Kosova National Art Gallery and the US Office of the time. Its primary idea was to organize a traditional exhibition as a photography competition which would gather new photographers. Anyone is eligible to enter, with the prize being 1000 Euros. This initiative resulted with the yearly exhibition which has been held since, and has gained a reputation as the most important photography competition not only in Kosovo, but throughout the whole Albanian nation.

The winners so far has been:

- 2001: Burim Myftiu
- 2004: Mumin Jashari
- 2005: Eshref Qahili
- 2008: Linda Vukaj
- 2010: Chehalis Hegner
- 2011: Berat Murina
- 2012: Jetmir Idrizi
- 2013: Genc Kadriu

Burim Myftiu is Albanian American Visual Artist. He has received numerous awards and recognitions, and his work is held by major institutions internationally.

=== Muslim Mulliqi Prize Exhibition ===
The Muslim Mulliqi Prize is the most significant exhibition for contemporary visual arts in Kosovo, held in honor of the pioneer of modern painting Muslim Mulliqi. This aims to be one of the most interesting contemporary art projects in Southern Europe. It has been held since 2002, biannually, and experienced some pauses because of a lack of financial means.

The aim KNAG has given to itself in the latest editions of the Muslim Mulliqi Prize is the provision of the current Albanian visual art. The competition has expanded, including other exhibition spaces such as at the Gallery of the Ministry of Culture and the Amphitheater of the Architecture University.

Each year there are three members of different expertise in the jury, who decide the best work. The prize is 3000 Euros for the best artwork based on criteria assigned each year.

- 2003 winners: Jakup Ferri, Lulzim Zeqiri; curator: Nafja Zgonik; jury: Gjelosh Gjokaj, Nadja Zgonik, Gëzim Qëndro
- 2004 winners: Dren Maliqi, Mario Rizzi; curator: Gëzim Qëndro; jury: Eqrem Basha, Joa Ljunberg, Anjali Sen
- 2005 winners: Alban Hajdinaj, Hyesin Alptekin; curator: Mehmet Behluli; jury: Nikola Dietrich, Sergio Boynik, Gëzim Qëndro
- 2006 winners: Nebih Muiqi, Ismet Jonuzi; curator: Mustafa Ferizi; jury: Suzana Varvarica Kuka, Agim Salihu, Basri çapriqi
- 2007 winners: Lumturi Blloshmi, Bekim Gllogu; curator: Suzana Varvarica Chukka; jury: Nadja Zgonik, Gjelosh Gjokai, Ali Podrimja
- 2008 winners: Jae Pas; curators: D.N.K./FILOART, Zeni Ballazhi; jury: the artists
- 2009 winners: Antigona Selmani, Loreta Ukshini, Malsore Bejta; curators: Gazmend Ejupi, Michele Robecchi; jury: Albert Heta, Zake Prevlukaj
- 2010 winners: curator: Fitore Isufi-Koja, Valbona Rexhepi
- 2012 winners: Abedin Azizi; curator: Galit Eilat, Charles Esche
- 2014 curator: Corinne Diserens
- 2016 winner: Fani Zguro; curator: Artan Shabani
- 2018 winners: Artan Hajrullahu and Valdrin Thaçi; curator: Iara Boubnova

== Disciplines and artists ==
Many exhibitions in many galleries around the world, such as Daut Berisha in Paris, the US, Mexico, Mikel Gjokaj in Rome, Brussels, Tirana, and Bahri Drançolli in Munchen, Germany, they have helped spread the knowledge of Kosovar art.

Artists whose work has been exhibited at the museum include Masar Caka, Tahir Emra, Gjelosh Gjokaj, Ibrahim Kodra, Nimon Lokaj, Muslim Mulliqi, Visar Mulliqi, Ramadan Ramadani, Esat Valla, Sislej Xhafa, Haki Xhakli, Hysni Krasniqi, Musë Prelvukaj, Agim Çavdarbasha and Burim Myftiu.

== Transport connections ==
Service	Station/stop	Lines/routes served	Distance from National Gallery
Pristina Buses	The University of Pristina Campus / Economy Faculty	3A	6 minutes
Pristina Buses	The University of Pristina Campus / Economy Faculty	5	6 minutes
Pristina Buses	The University of Pristina Campus / Economy Faculty	7	6 minutes
Pristina Buses	The University of Pristina Campus / Economy Faculty	7A	6 minutes
Pristina Buses	The University of Pristina Campus / Economy Faculty	10	6 minutes

== Exhibitions ==
=== Pre-Kosovo War period exhibitions ===
1979–1999	Name of exhibition	Visitors
1979	The Kosova National Art Gallery Collection	19,286
1980	Jubilee Exhibition of Shyqri Nimani	12,197
1981	Personal Exhibition of Engjëll Berisha	
1981	Personal Exhibition of Simon Shiroka	
1981	Tito, the Word, the Thought and the Work	38,000
1981	Retrospective of Odhise Paskali	14,045
1982	The First Salon of Caricature	6,830
1983	The Young Kosovar Artists	9,450
1984	Personal Exhibition of Nebih Muriqi	12,510
1985	The Exhibition of the three Cartoonists	N/A
1985	Serbian paintings in the Era of Realism	7,810
1986	The XIII Spring Salon of Kosova	N/A
1987	Gjelosh Gjokaj	N/A
1988	10 years of Architecture Study	N/A
1989	The Book Salon	N/A
1990	Bashkim Popoja	N/A
1991	Esat Valla	N/A
1992	The Kosova Contemporary Art	N/A
1999	Kosovo Galgota	N/A

=== Kosovo post-war period exhibitions ===
Year	Month	Name of exhibition
2000	Jan	Solemn reopening of the Kosovo Art Gallery, 'Golgota Kosovare'
2000	Feb	Muslim Mulliqi Retrospective and Promotion of the Monograph
2000	Mar	XI Drawing Biennial Exhibition
2000	Apr	Co-exhibition between KFOR artists and Kosova artists
2000	May	Gjelosh Gjokaj Personal Exhibition
2000	Jun	Kulla Shqiptare 1979–1999
2000	Jun	Esat Valla Personal Exhibition
2000	Jul	The Gallery Collection
2000	Aug	The Symbol of Peace
2000	Oct	Richard Harden Personal Exhibition
2000	Nov	Rexhep Ferri Personal Exhibition
2000	Nov	'Salloni i Nëntorit' Exhibition
2000	Dec	'Travelling in Memory' Photography Exhibition
2001	Jan	Adem Kastrati Personal Exhibition
2001	Feb	'Youth in-between the Past and Future' Photography Exhibition
2001	Feb	Art Against Violence
2001	Mar	Nebih Muriqi Personal Exhibition
2001	Apr	Nostalgia
2001	May	An Exhibition Funded by the Gallery
2001	May	Engjëll Berisha Personal Exhibition
2001	Jun	Nysret Salihamixhiqit Personal Exhibition
2001	Jul	International Graphic Authors
2001	Sept	International Artistic Photography Exhibition
2001	Oct	Hamdi Bardhi Personal Exhibition
2001	Oct	Agim Çavdarbasha Retrospective Exhibition
2001	Nov	Kosovar Design Retrospective
2002	Jan	Project NOW, German Artists Exhibition
2002	Feb	Cecil Beaton Personal Photography Exhibition
2002	Mar	Project US, Ten Young Kosovar Creators Exhibition
2002	Mar	Eshref Qahili Personal Exhibition
2002	Mar	"Kosova 1999" Markus Matzel and Sebastian Bolesch
2002	Apr	Philipe Bazini Photography Exhibition
2002	Apr	Qamil Grezda Personal Exhibition
2002	May	"The Portrait"
2002	May	International Ceramics Exhibitions from Tirana
2002	Jun	Masar Caka Personal Exhibition
2002	Jul	"Day of Pristina" Exhibition by SHAFK
2002	Jul	Bedri Emra Personal Exhibition
2002	Aug	Association of Visual and Applicative Artists of Peja
2002	Sept	Artistic Photography Exhibition "Gjon Mili" II
2002	Oct	Afrim Hajrullahu Personal Photography Exhibition
2002	Oct	Association of Visual Artists from Gjilan
2002	Nov	International Ceramics Exhibition from Croatia "Vase For Flowers"
2002	Nov	Mladen Popoviq Personal Exhibition
2002	Nov	I. Kodra, M. Mulliqi, Gj. Gjokaj, A. Çavdarbasha, R. Feri, T. Emra, Academic Exhibition
2002	Dec	90 Years of Country, Culture, Art
2003	Jan	"Artists of Tomorrow" Exhibition
2003	Feb	Artists Association from Prizren
2003	Feb	Violeta Xhaferri Personal Exhibition
2003	Mar	Asim Lokaj Personal Exhibition
2003	Mar	"YOU" Ten Young Artists Exhibition
2003	Mar	Japanese Painter Emiko Horimoto Personal Exhibition
2003	Apr	Tahir Emra Retrospective Exhibition
2003	May	American Painter Richard Harden Personal Exhibition
2003	June	Nagip Berisha Personal Exhibition
2003	June	Gjakova Visual Art
2003	June	The Vision of The Past and The Future
2003	July	Common Exhibition of Young Artists from Kosova and Albania
2003	July	International Graphics Exhibition
2003	Sept	Mother Teresa, Icon of Eternity
2003	Sept	Ibrahim Kodra Personal Exhibition
2003	Oct	Shyqri Nimani Retrospective Exhibition
2003	Nov	Rudi Goga Personal Exhibition
2003	Dec	"Artists of Tomorrow" Competition
2003	Dec	Kosovar Artists in Paris
2004	Feb	International Ceramics Exhibition
2004	Mar	Arian Berisha Individual Exhibition
2004	Mar	Biennial International Drawing Exhibition
2004	Apr	Dhimitër Shuteriqi Personal Exhibition
2004	Jun	German Artists Exhibition
2004	May	Sculpture in Albania 1924–2004
2004	Jul	Omer Kaleshi Personal Exhibition
2004	Jul	'Platforma, Reforma, Deforma' Exhibition
2004	Aug	Kosovar Modern Art, Mumbai
2004	Aug	Exhibition in Kobe, Japan
2004	Sept	Micheal McClellan Artistic Photography Exhibition
2004	Sept	Ferid Hudhri "Albania Throughout Art" Monography Promotion
2004	Oct	Kosovar Design Week
2004	Oct	Simon Shiroka (1927–1994) Personal Exhibition
2004	Nov	Helsinki Architect Alvar Aalto Personal Exhibition
2004	Dec	XXXI November Salon
2004	Dec	Muslim Mulliqi Prize
2004	N/A	Simon Shiroka (1927–1994) Retrospective Exhibition
2005	N/A	International Exhibitions from Hanover, Germany
2006	N/A	Afrim Spahiu's Exhibition of "The Photographs"
2007	N/A	Symbols of Kosova
2008	N/A	10th Anniversary of the death of the Artist Muslim Mulliqi
2009	N/A	Retrospective Exhibition of Fatmir Krypa
2011	April	Burim Myftiu "Utopia in Chaos" - Retrospective Photography Exhibition
2012	May	Muslim Mulliqi Competition
2013	N/A	Agon Mulliqi The Symphony of forms
2014	Feb	Marubi

== Collection highlights ==
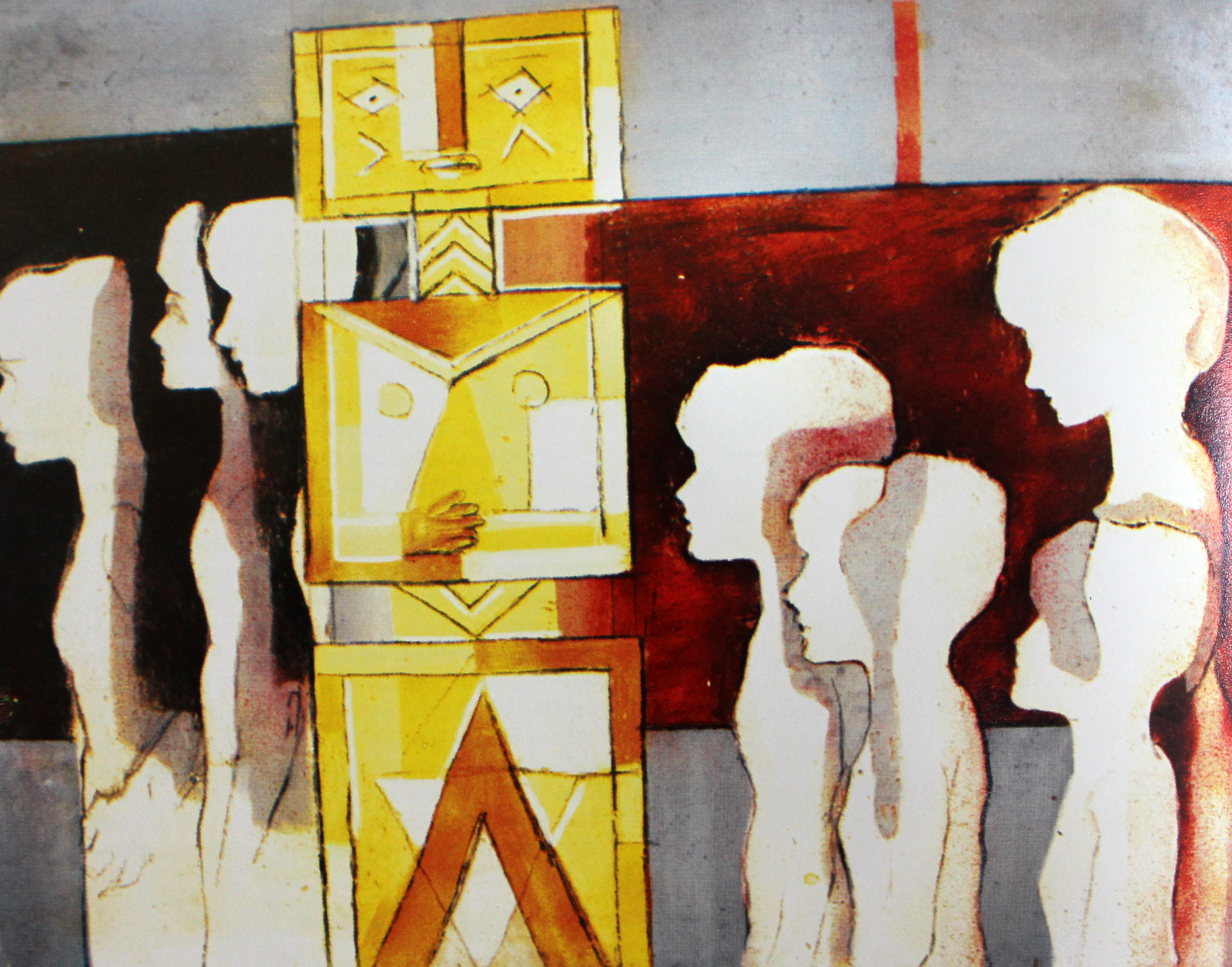
Ibrahim Kodra, Seeking new idols, 1968 oil on canvas, 80 × 100 cm

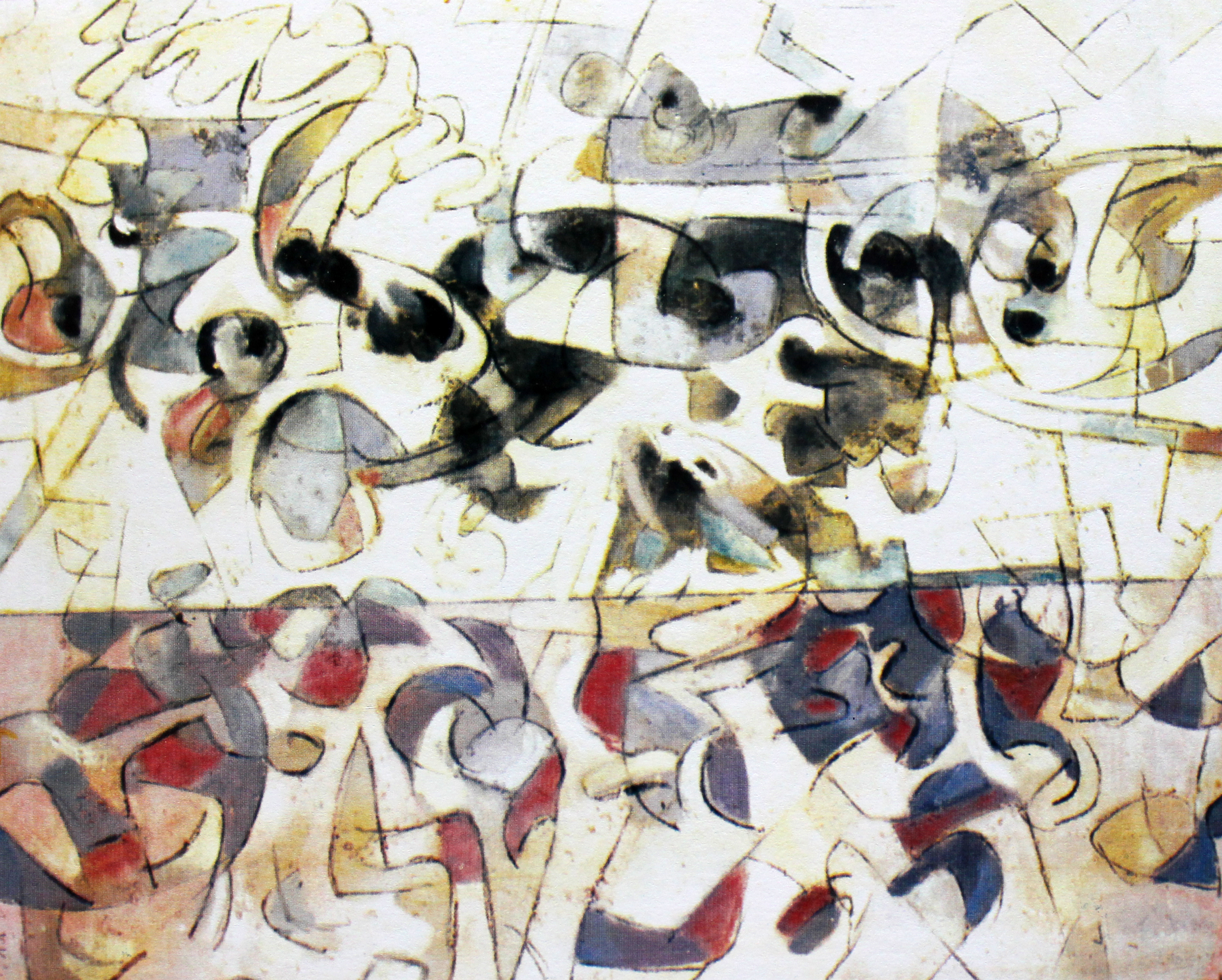
Kodra, The sea, 1968 oil on canvas, 80x100 cm

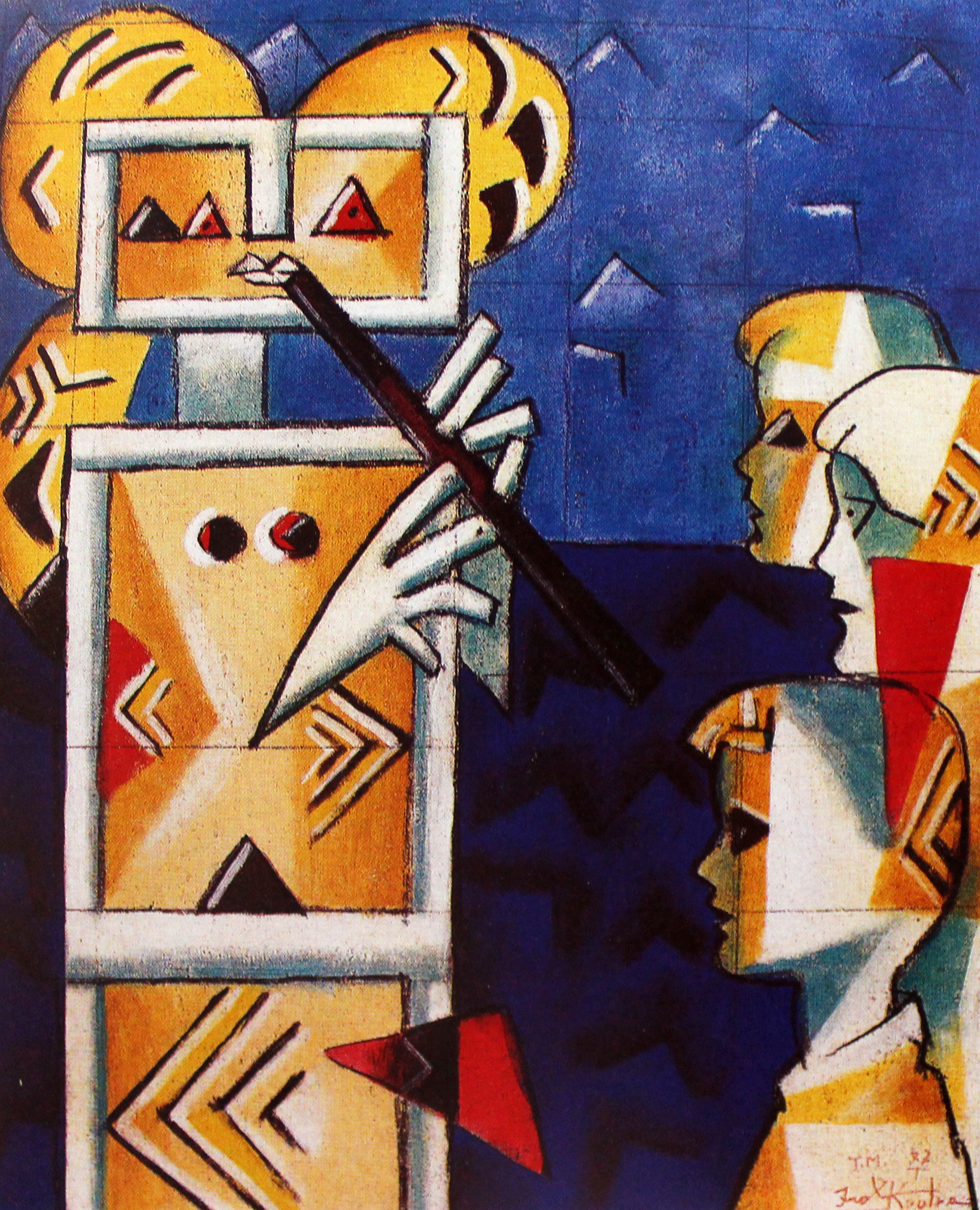
Kodra, Music lesson, 1997 oil on canvas, 80x100 cm

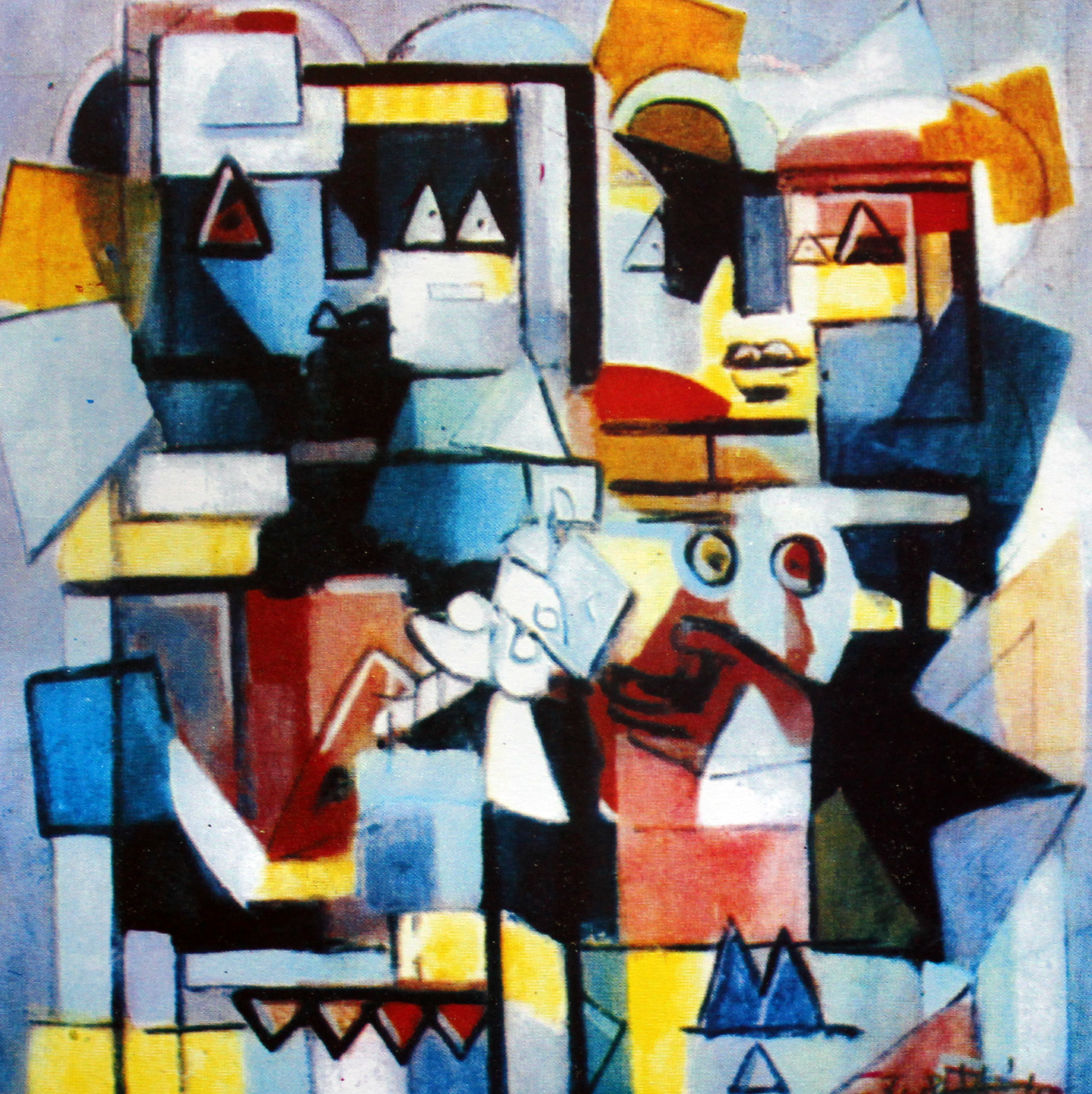
Kodra, The date, 1987 oil on canvas, 80x100 cm

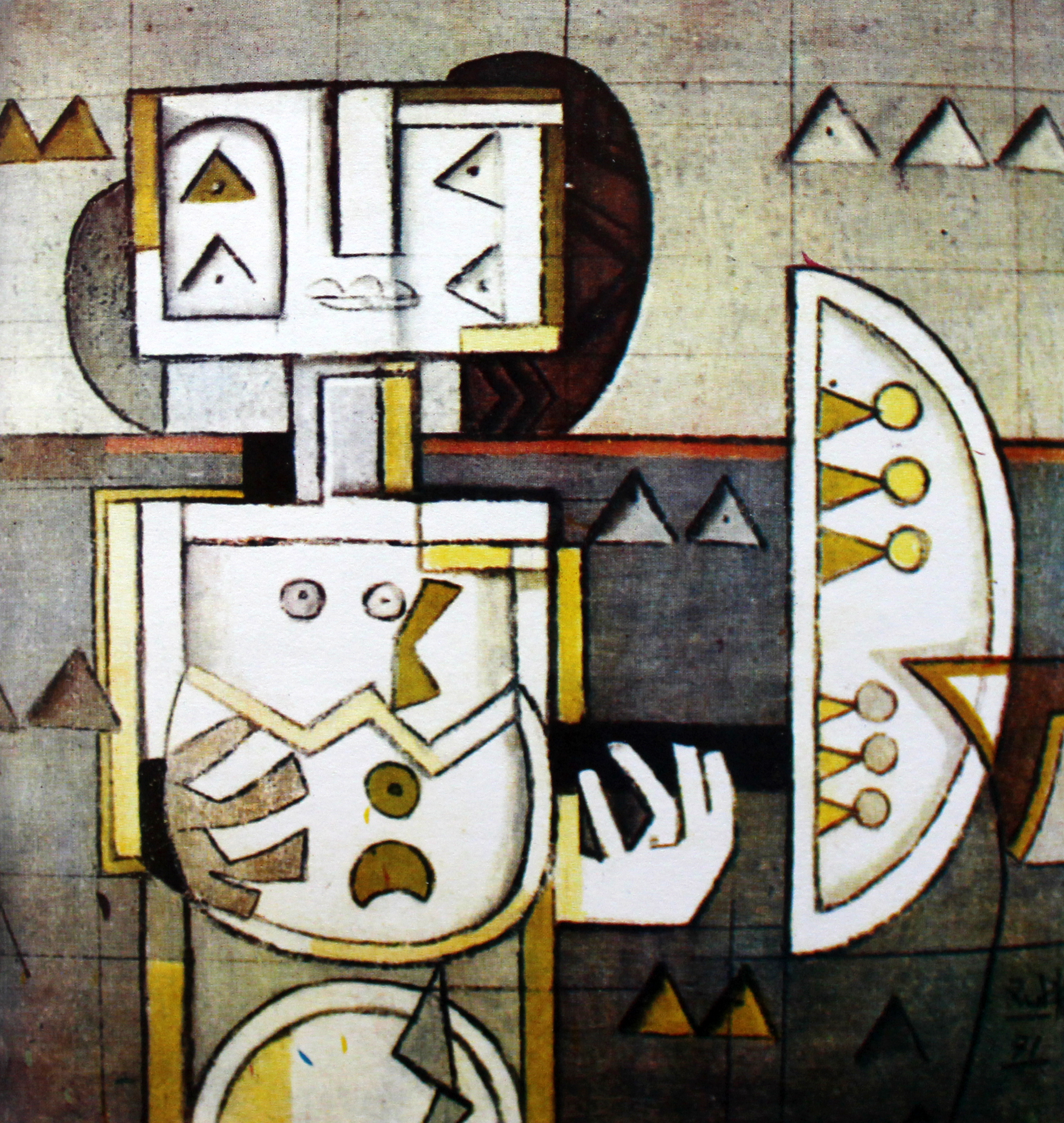
Kodra, The birth of the idol, 1971 oil on canvas, 80x100 cm

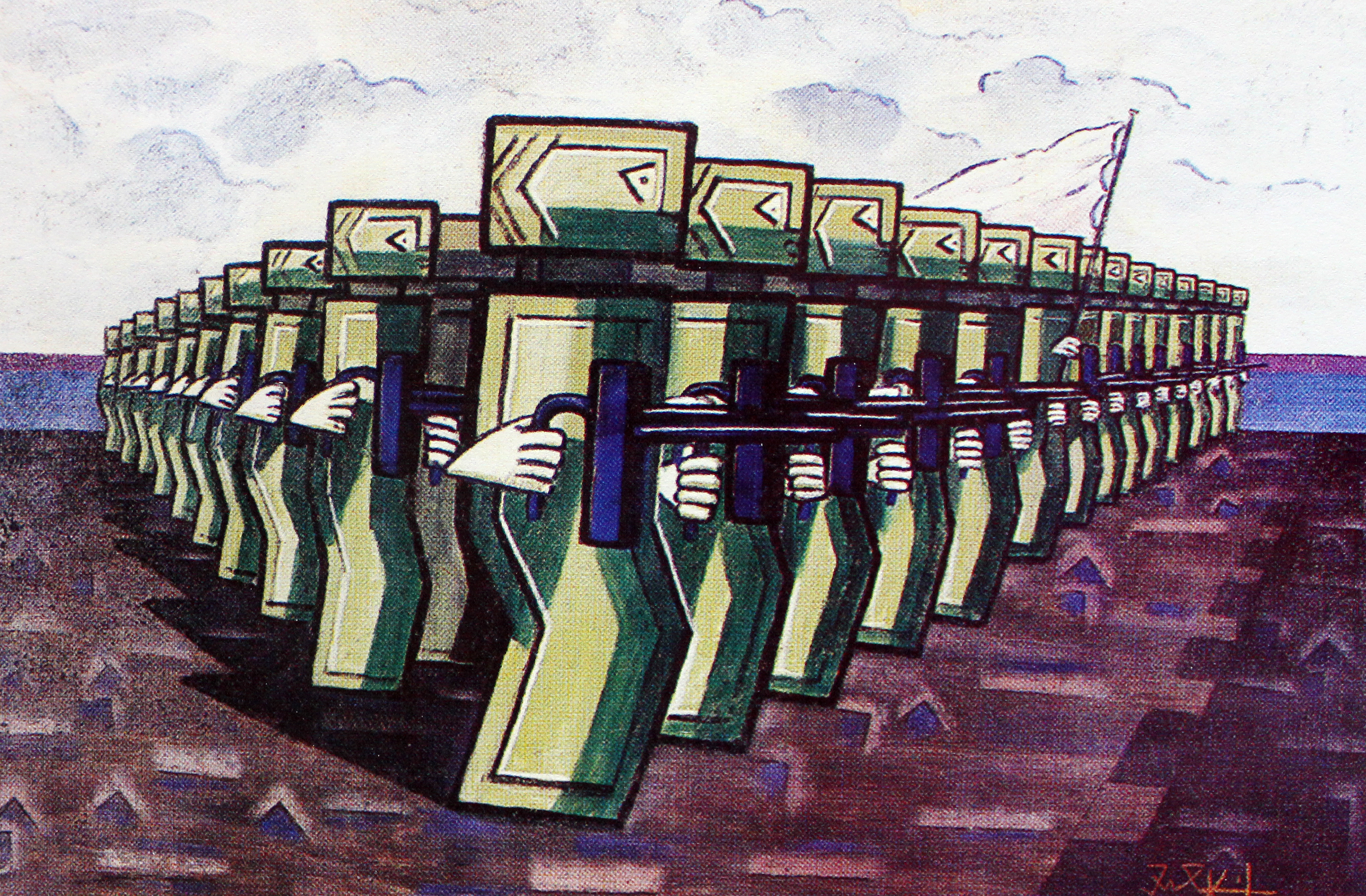
Kodra, The war for peace, 1977 oil on canvas, 80x100 cm

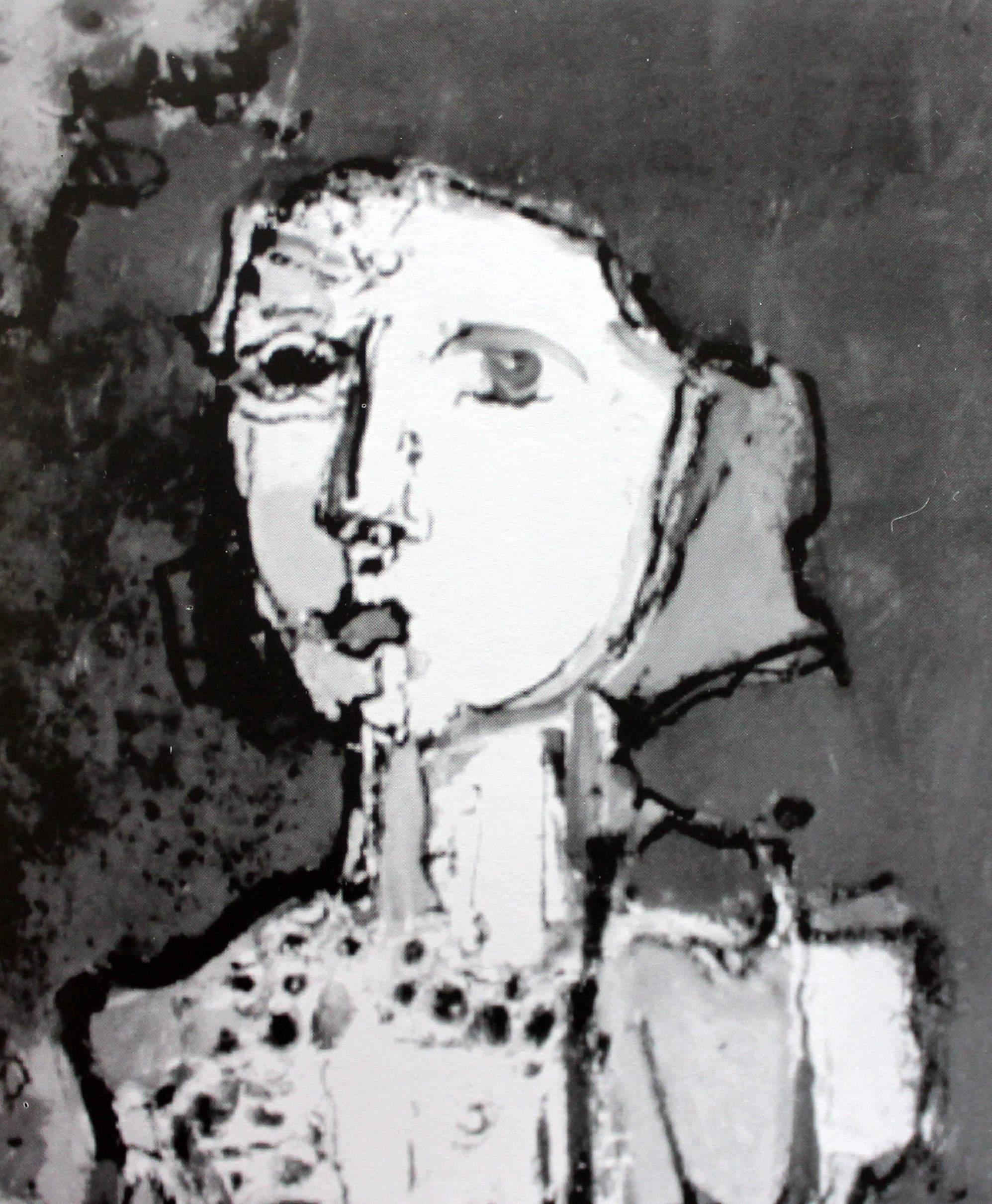
Gjelosh Gjokaj, Portrait Excerpt from Chronicle red, 2000, acrylic on paper, 50 × 70 cm

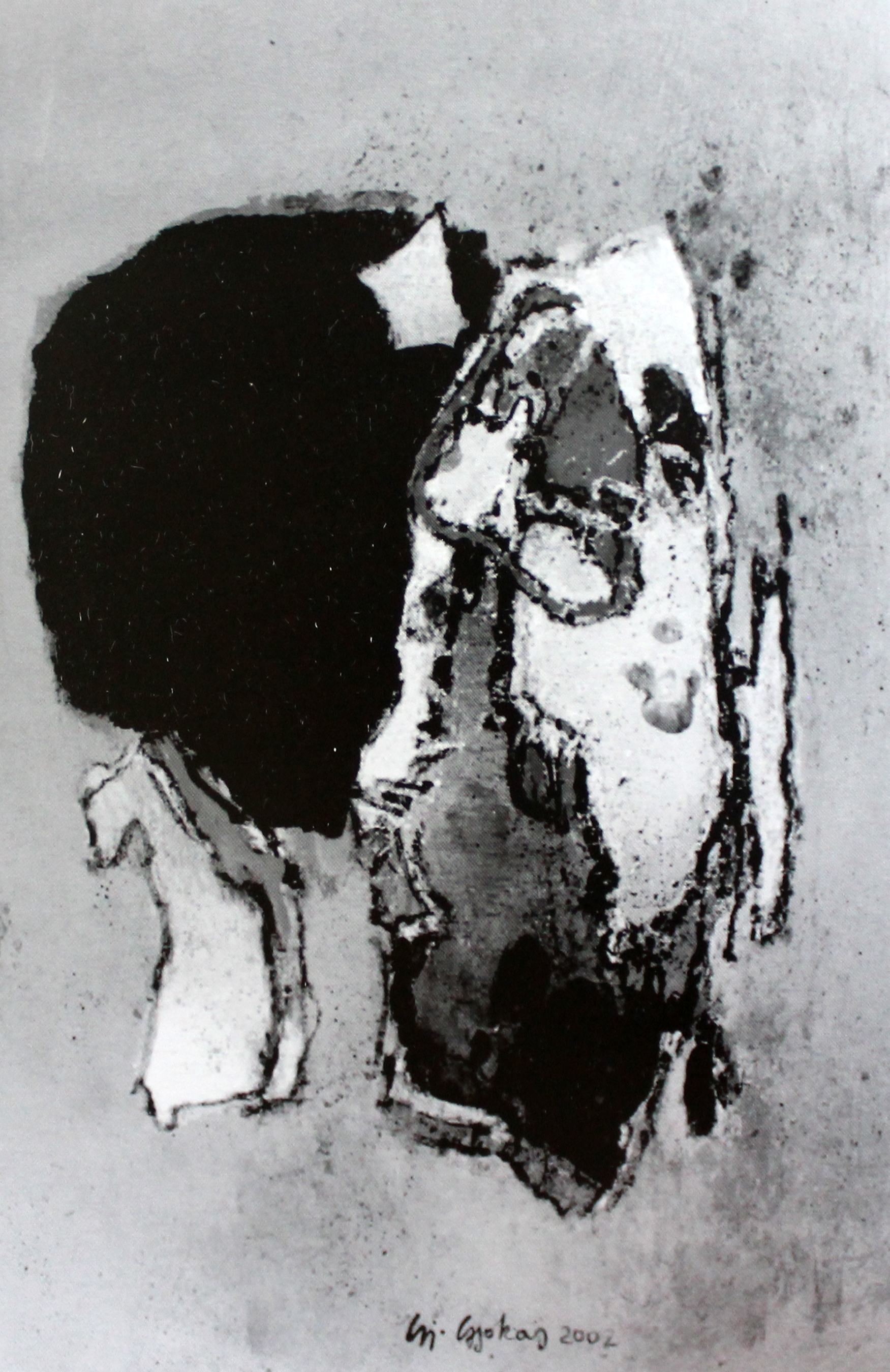
Gjelosh Gjokaj, Form 1, 2002, Combined technique, 70 × 49 cm

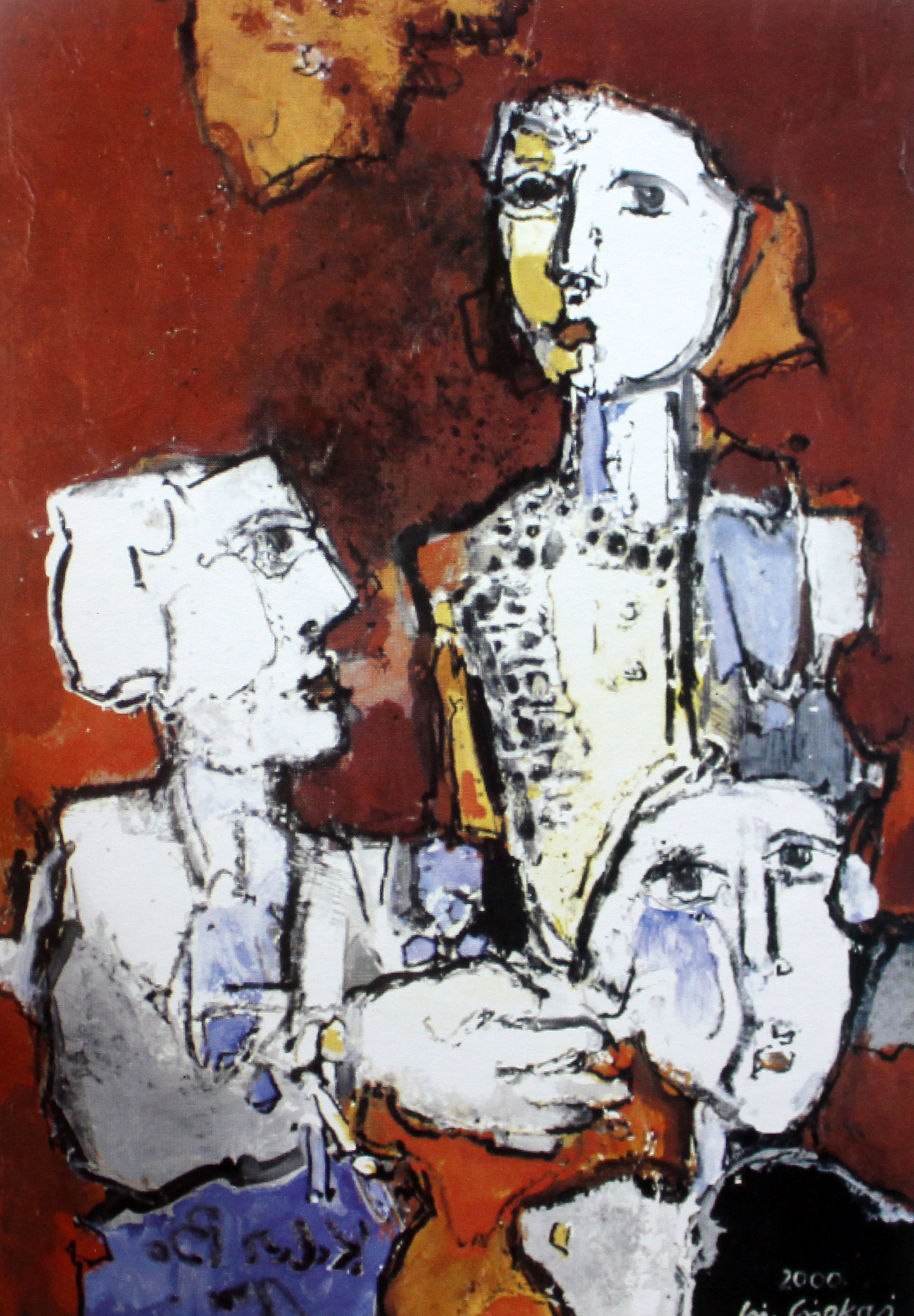
Gjelosh Gjokaj, Red Chronicle, 2001 acrylic on paper, 50 × 70 cm

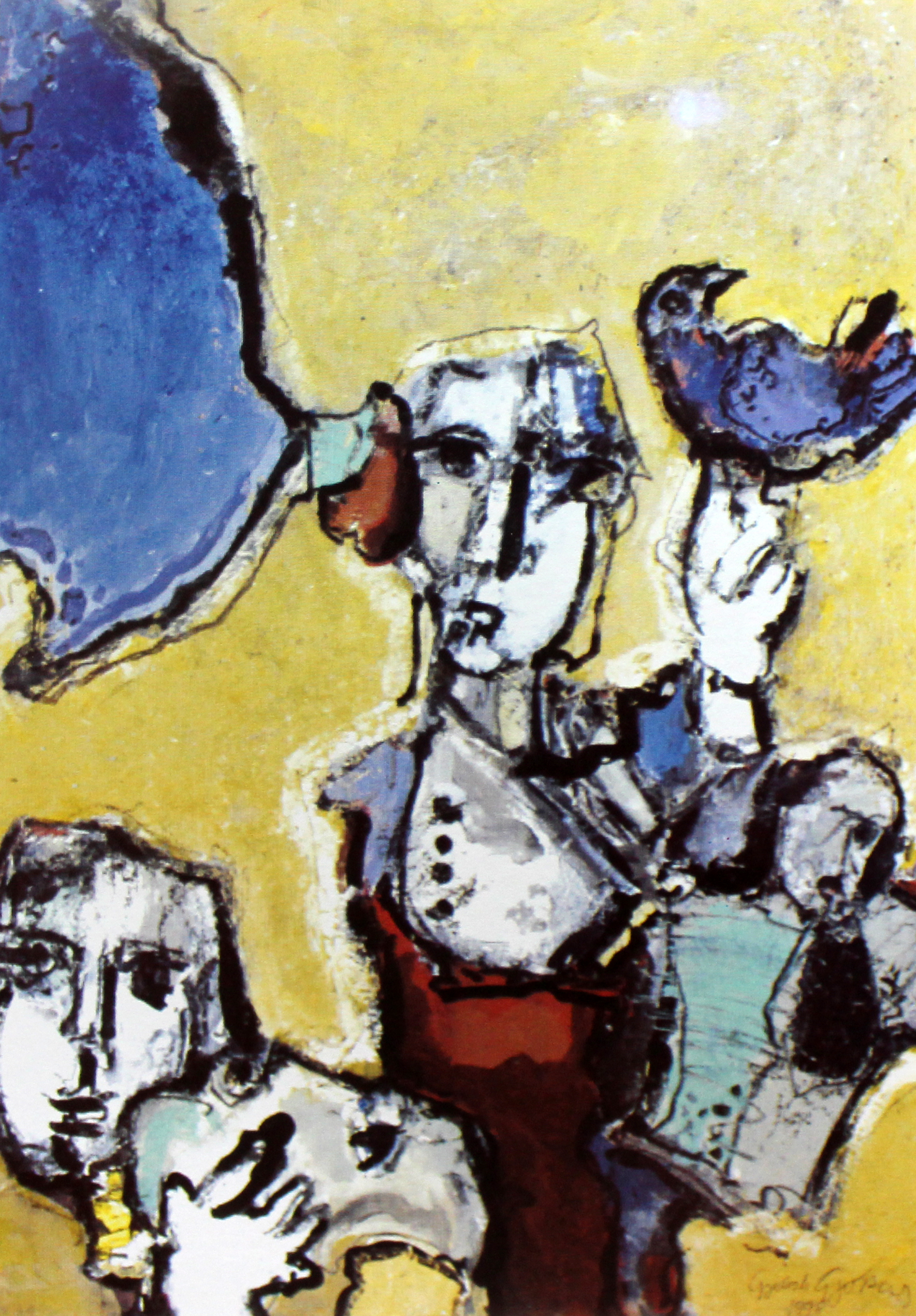
Gjelosh Gjokaj, Messages lyrical, 2001 acrylic on paper, 50 × 70

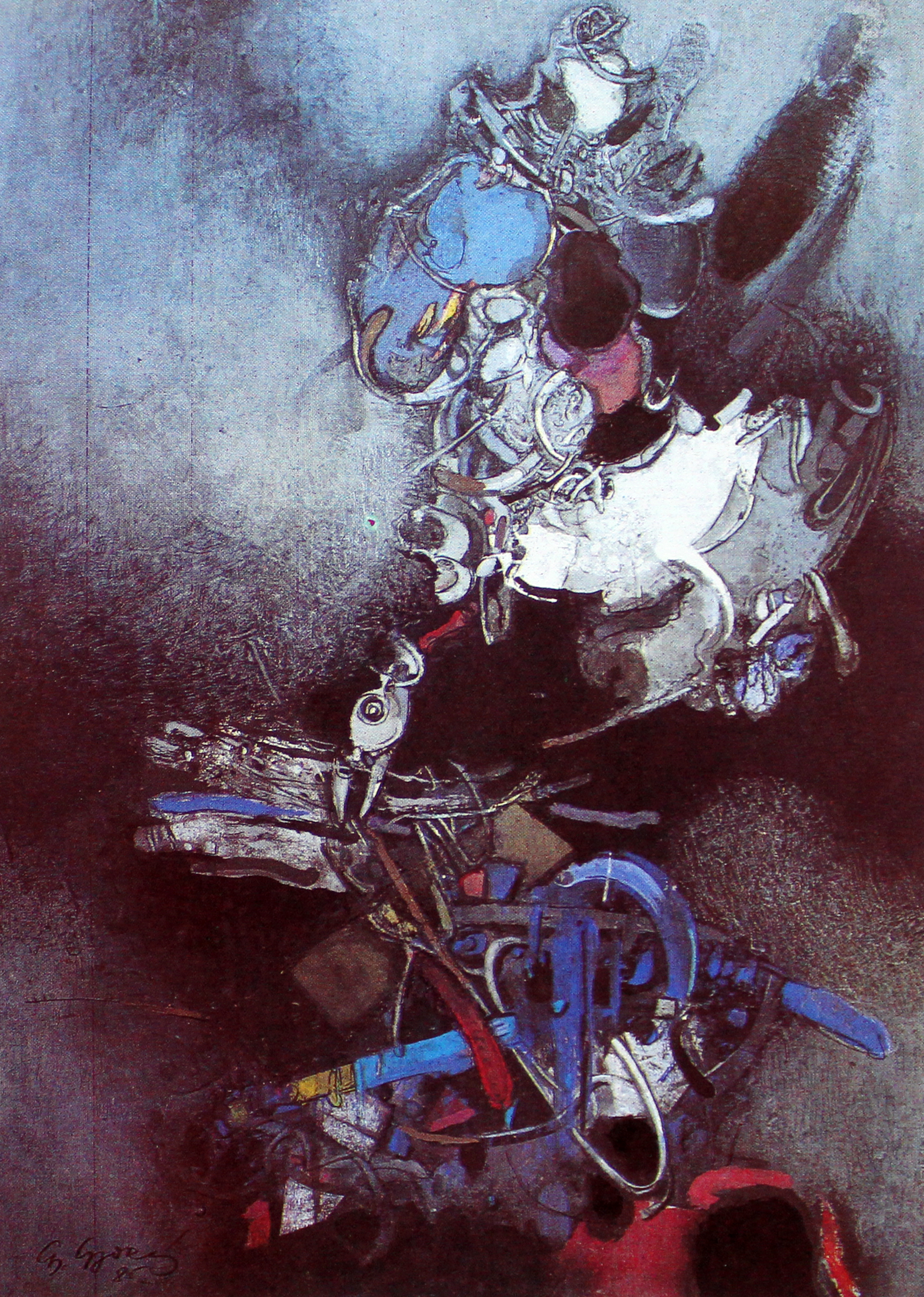
Gjelosh Gjokaj, Chicken, 1985 oil on canvas, 120 × 80 cm

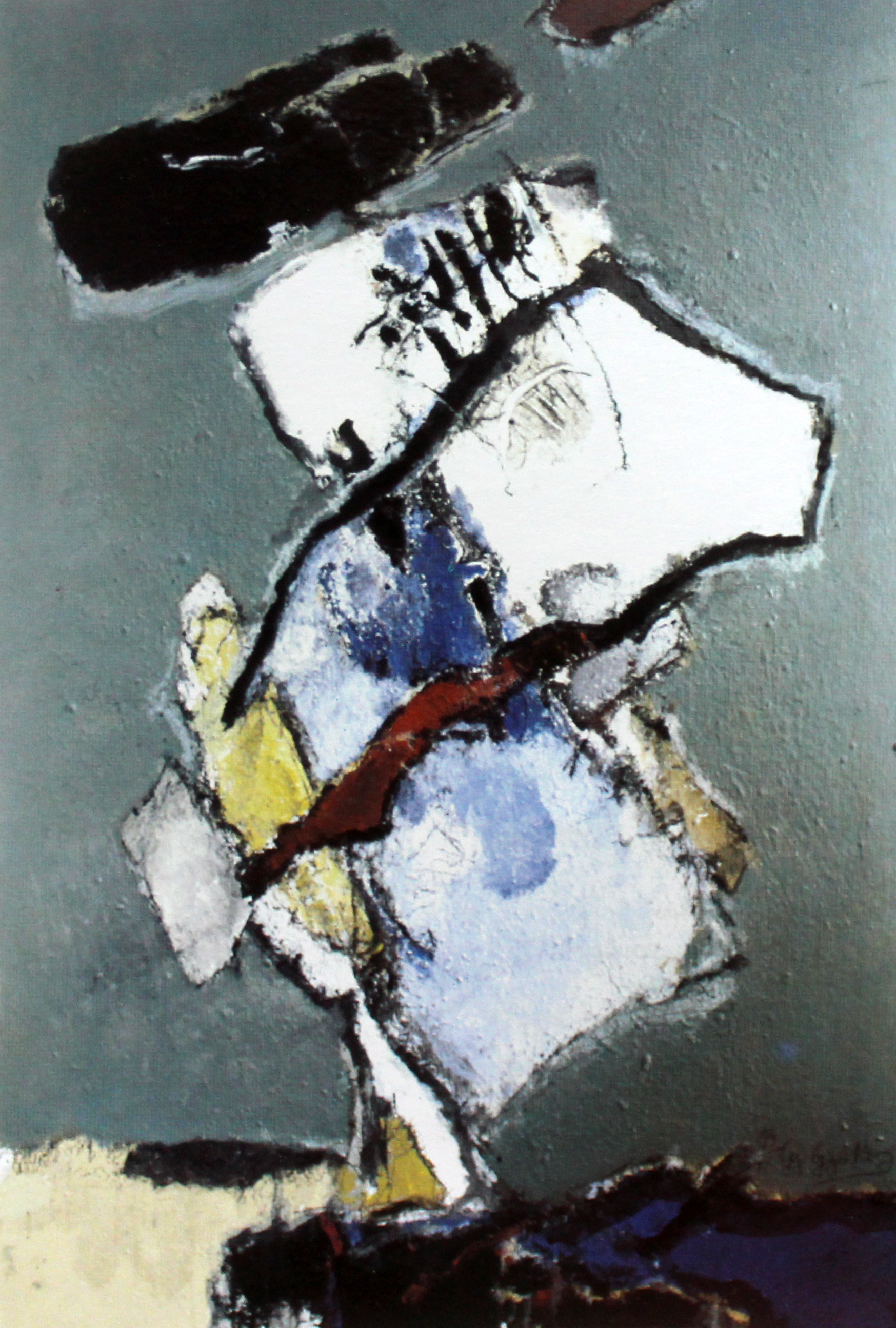
Gjelosh Gjokaj, No title, 1999 acrylic on paper

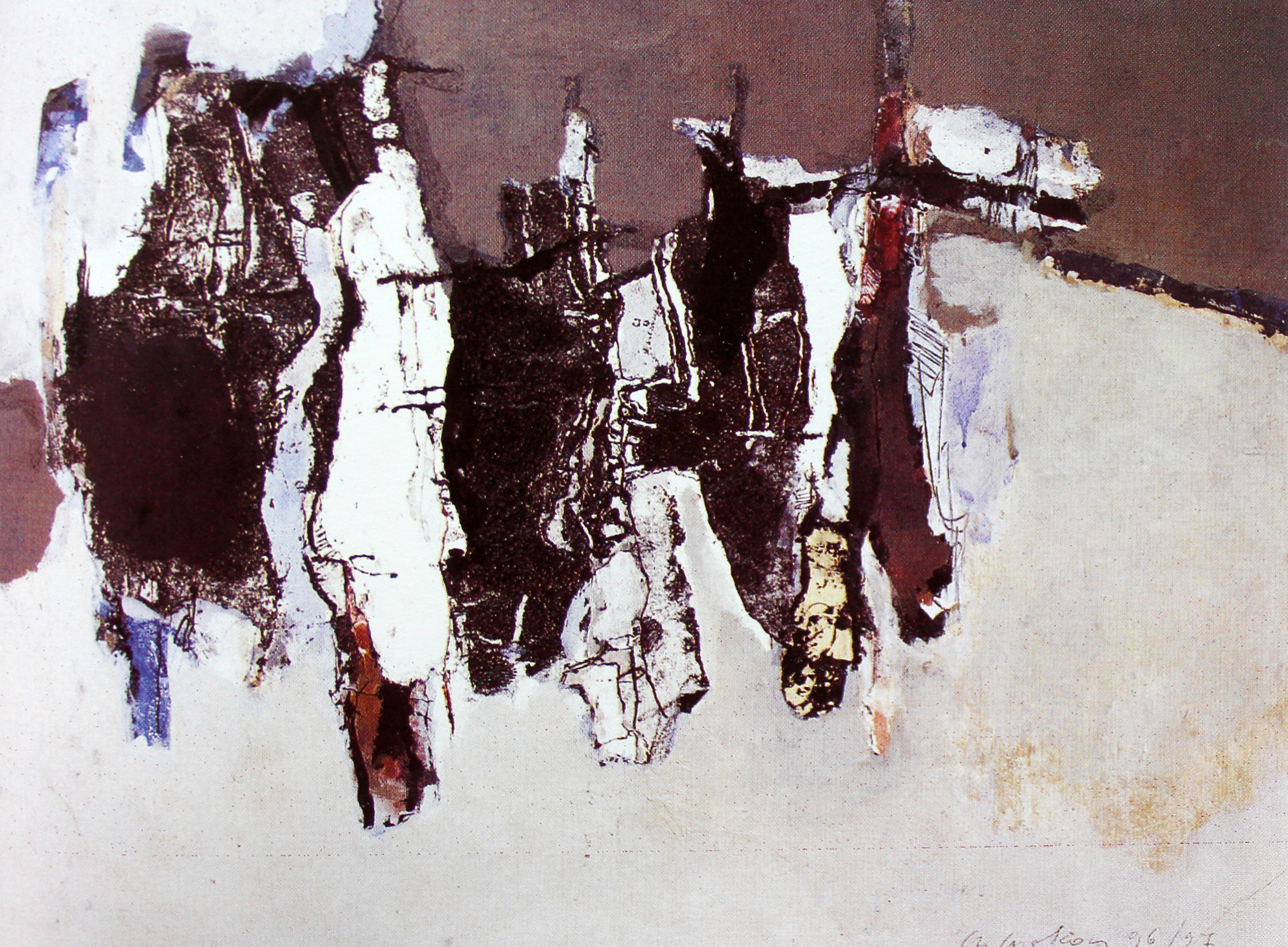
Gjelosh Gjokaj, Composition, 1997 oil on paper, 70 × 100 cm

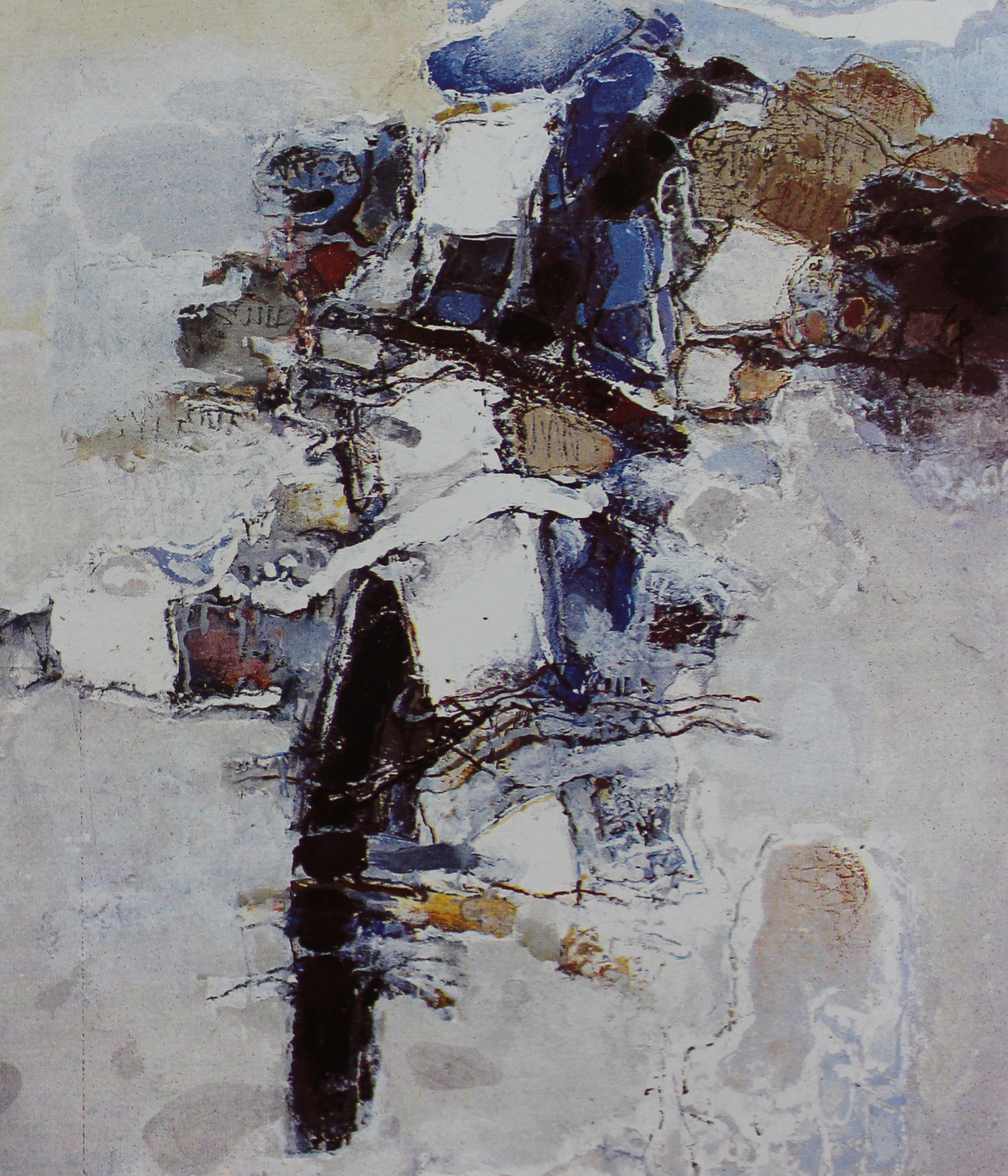
Gjelosh Gjokaj, Composition, 1991, combined technique, 100 × 70 cm

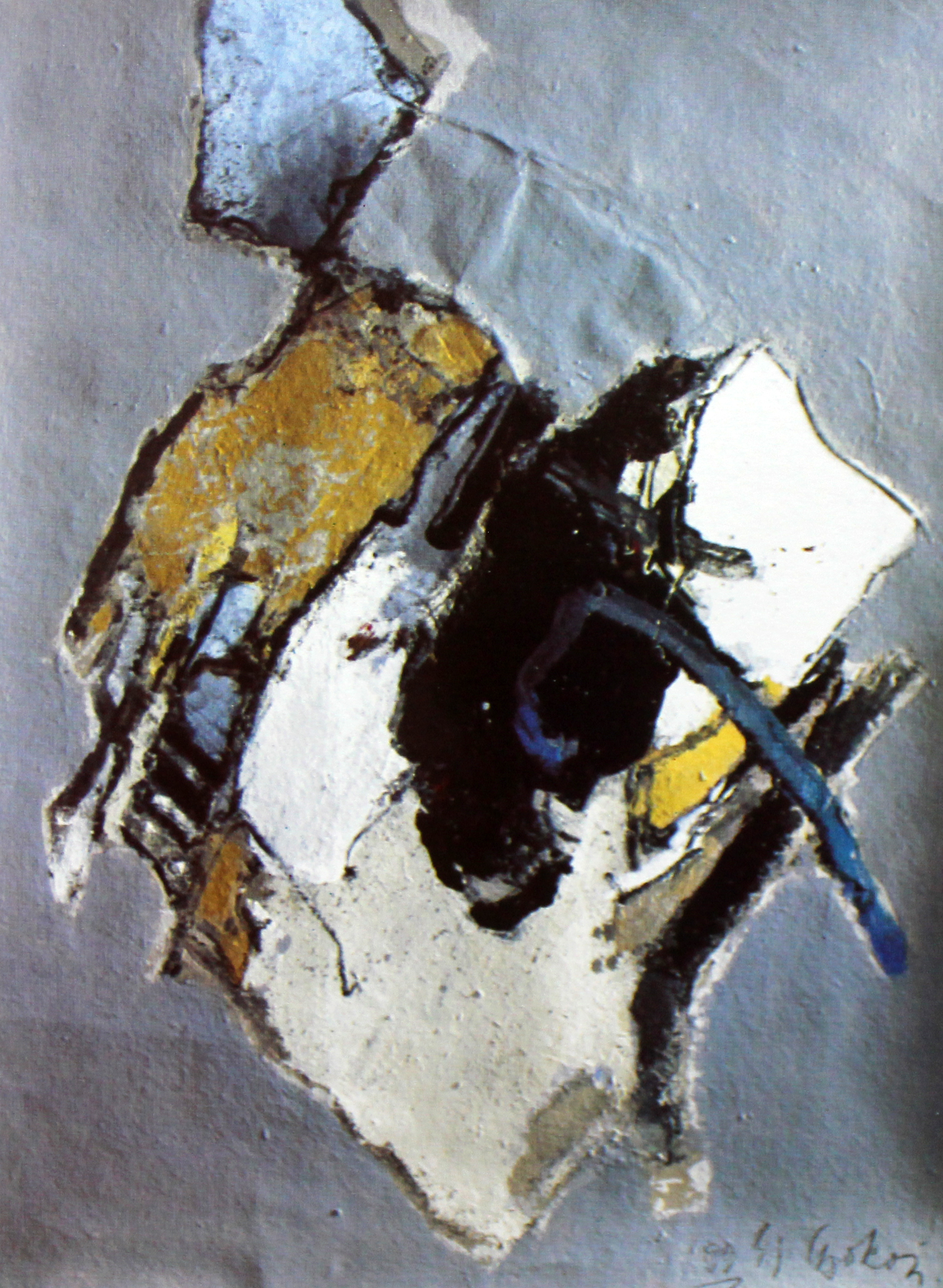
Gjelosh Gjokaj, No title, 1991, acrylic on paper

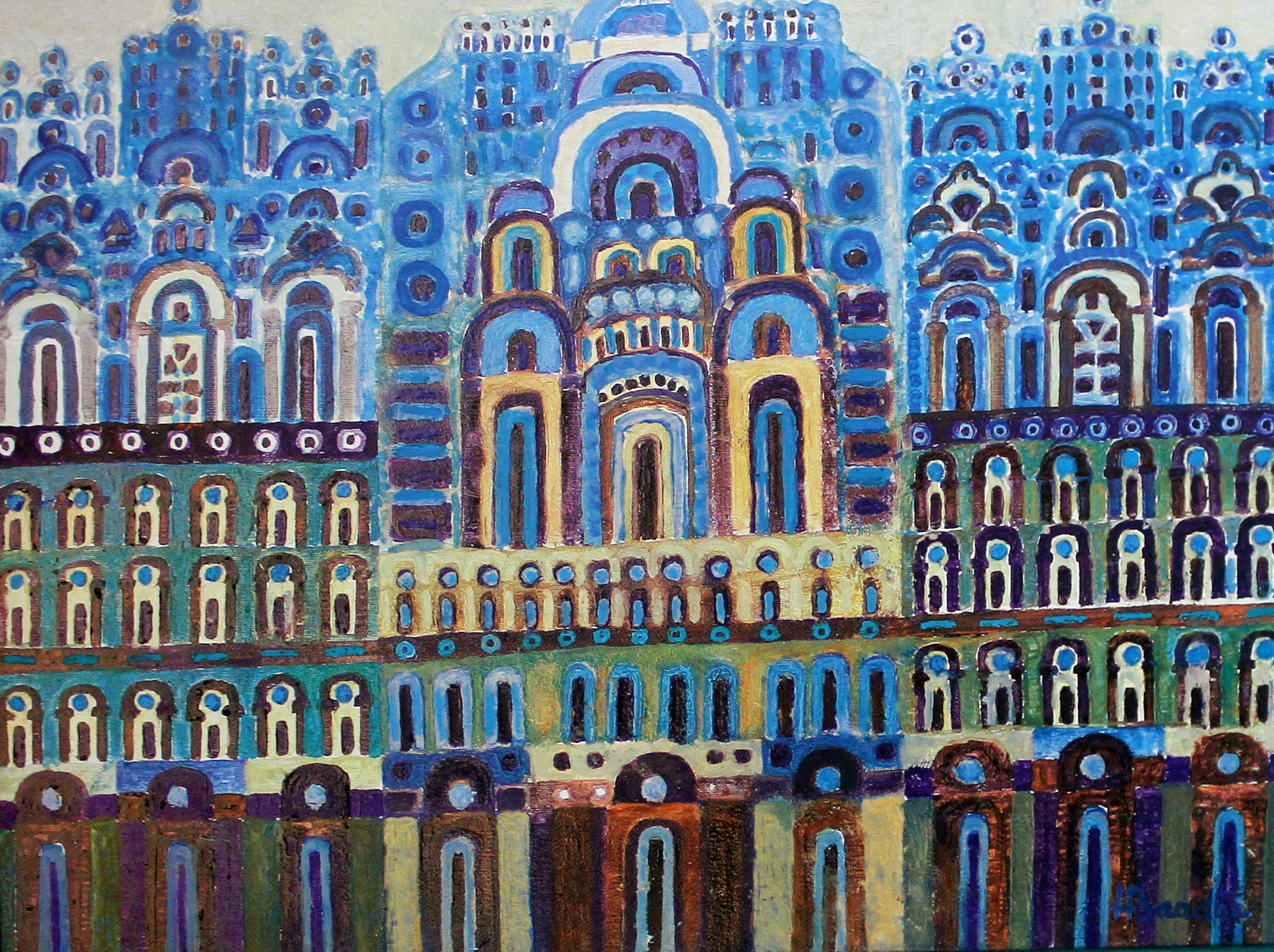
Hamdi Bardhi, "Facade", oil on canvas, 80 × 100 cm

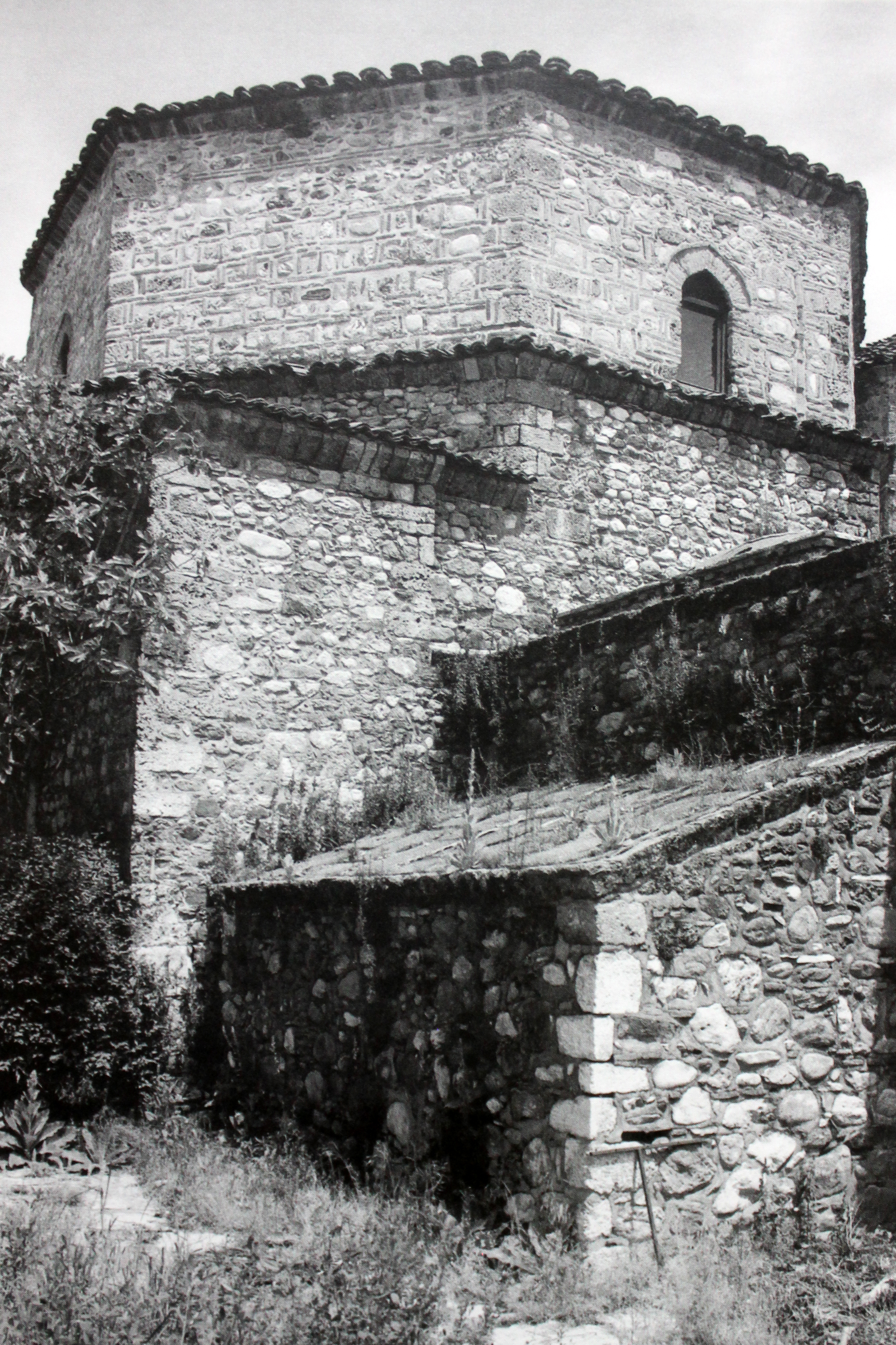
Michael McClellan, "Hammam", Prizren - Kosovo 2004

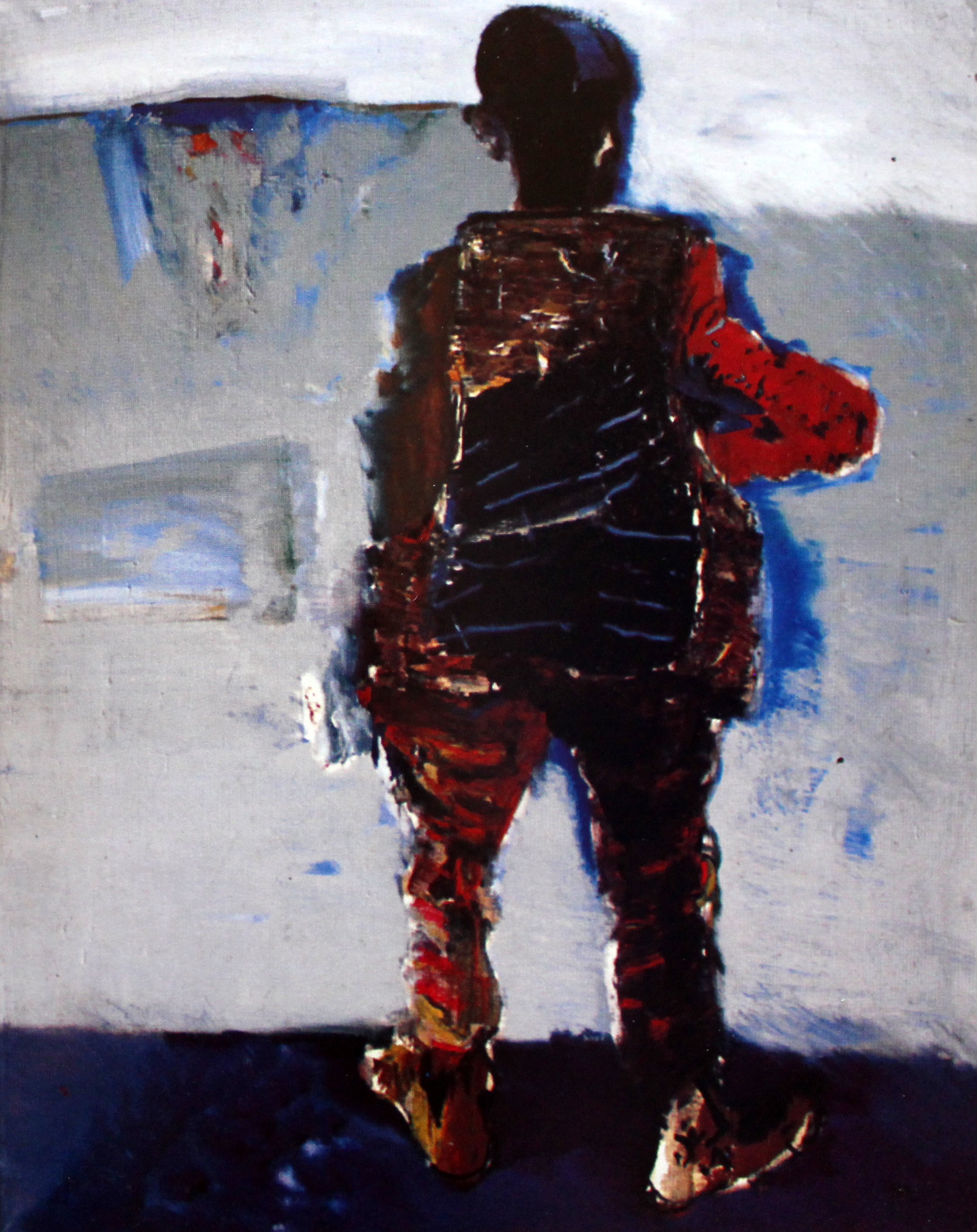
Muslim Mulliqi, Hamall, 1967 oil on canvas, 120 × 150 cm

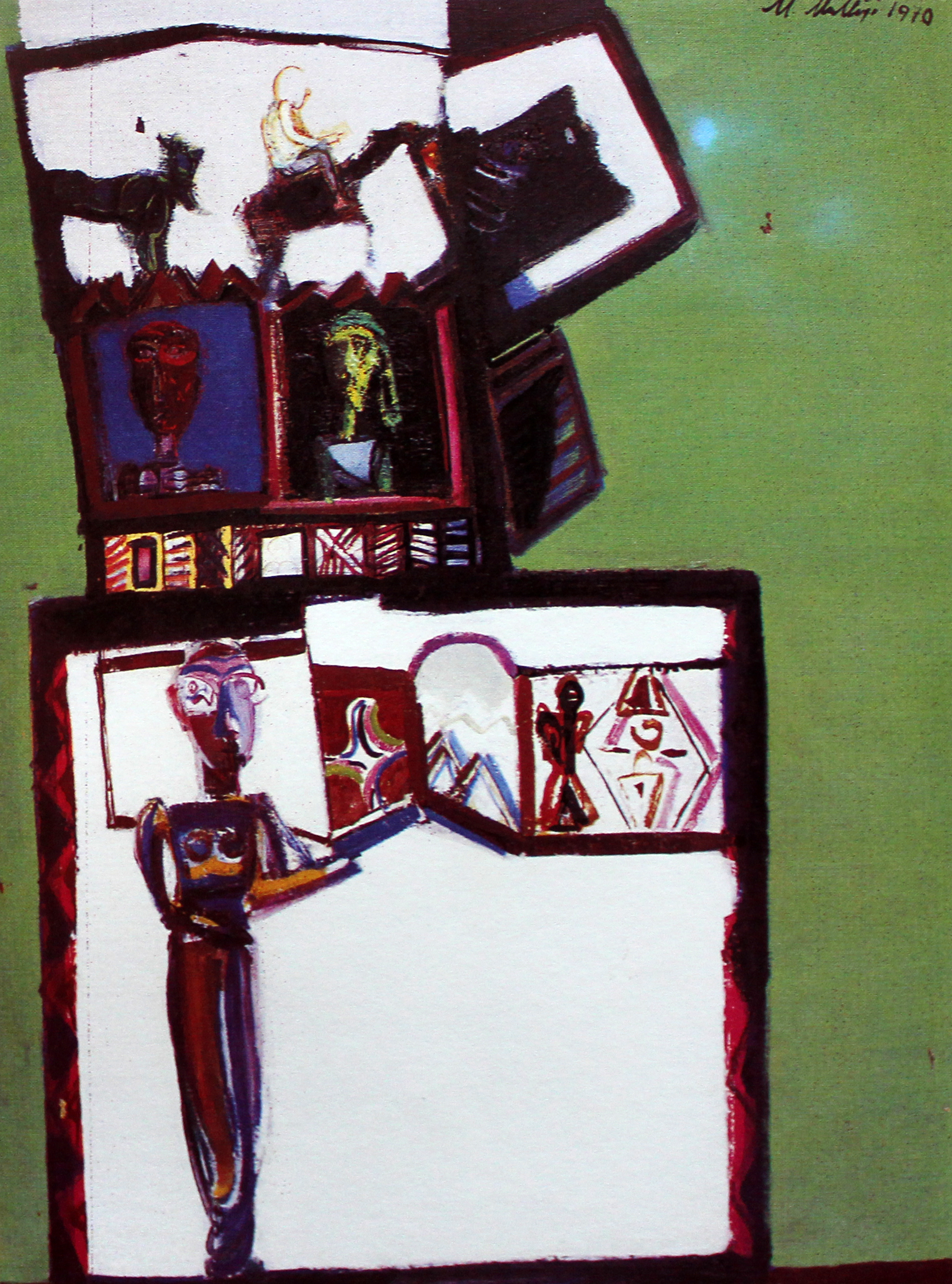
Muslim Mulliqi, "Motif from Prizren", 1970 oil on canvas, 124 × 100 cm

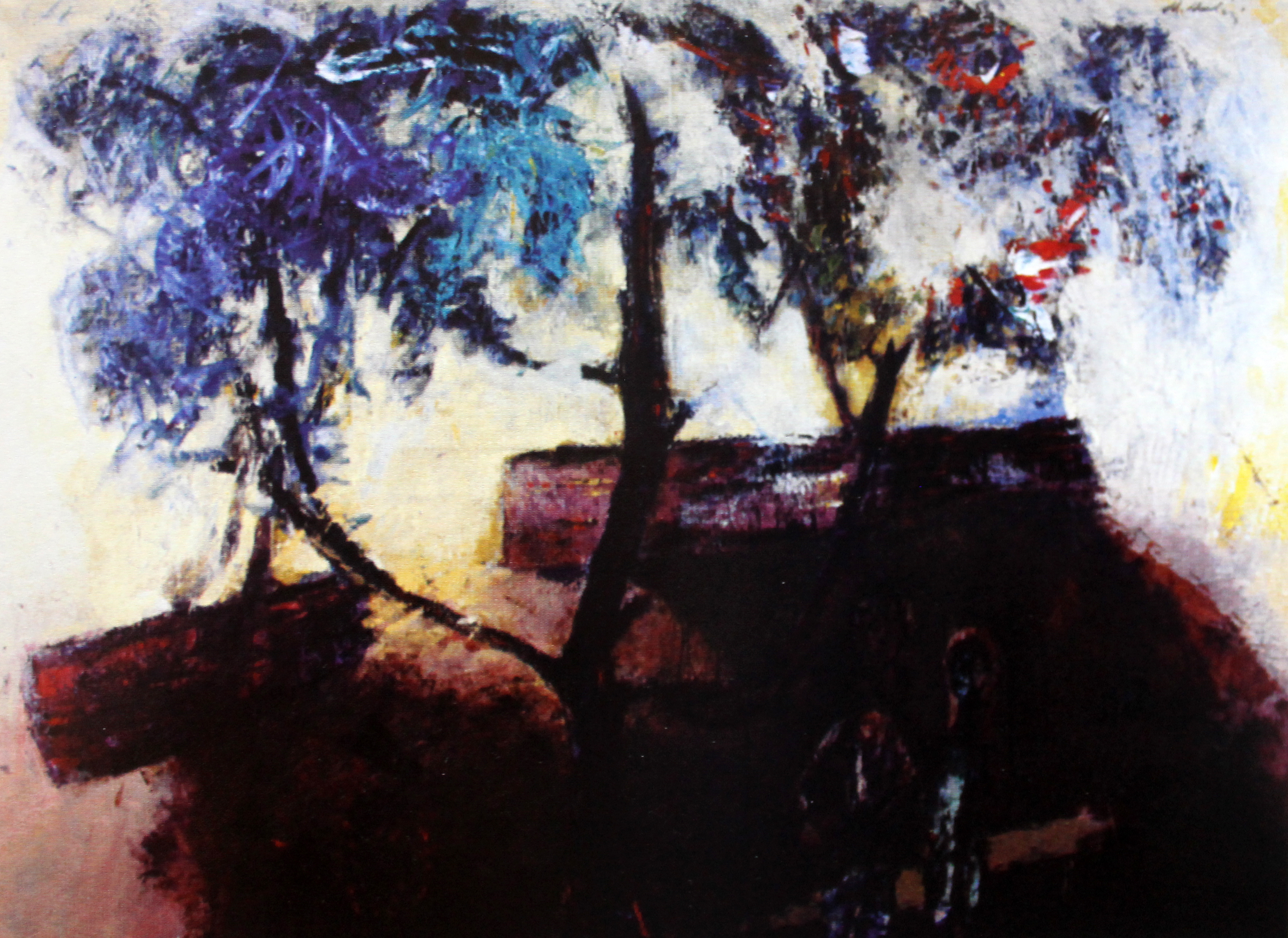
Muslim Mulliqi, Panorama, 1988 oil on canvas, 94 × 120 cm

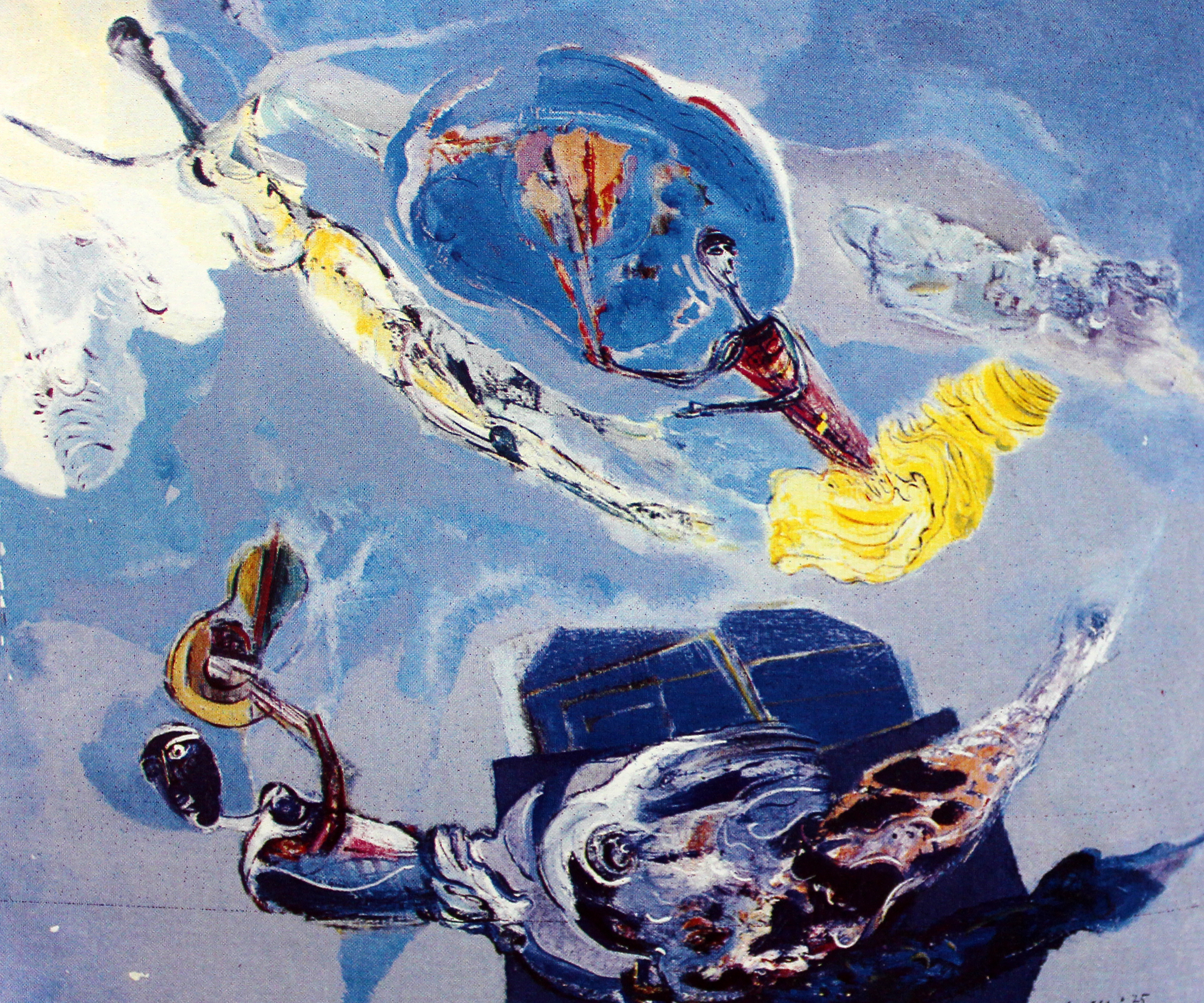
Muslim Mulliqi, "Journey to the sky", 1977 oil on canvas, 107 × 132 cm

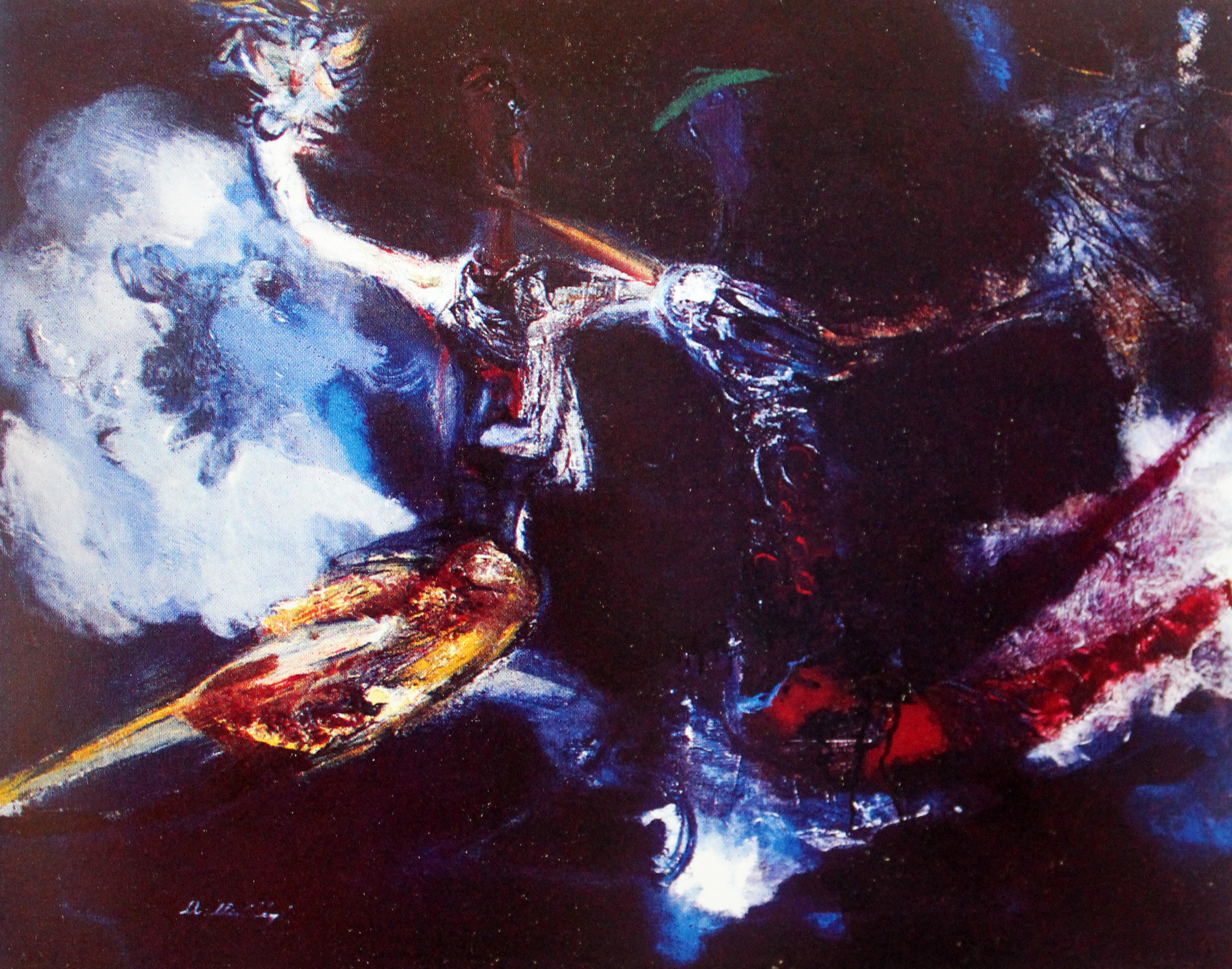
Muslim Mulliqi, "Asking new spaces", 1977 oil on canvas, 94 × 121 cm

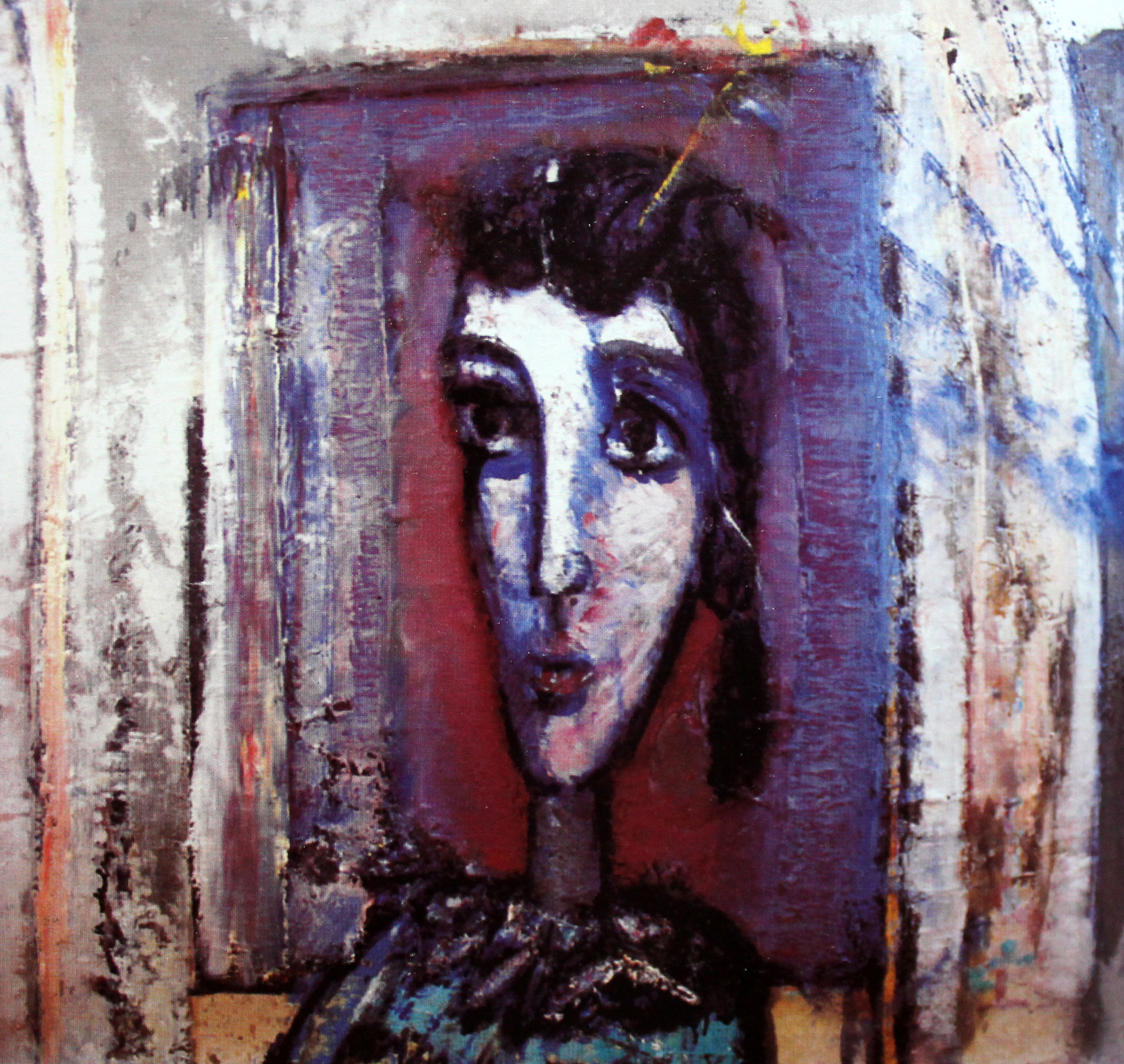
Muslim Mulliqi, Head, 1993 oil on plywood, 90 × 95 cm

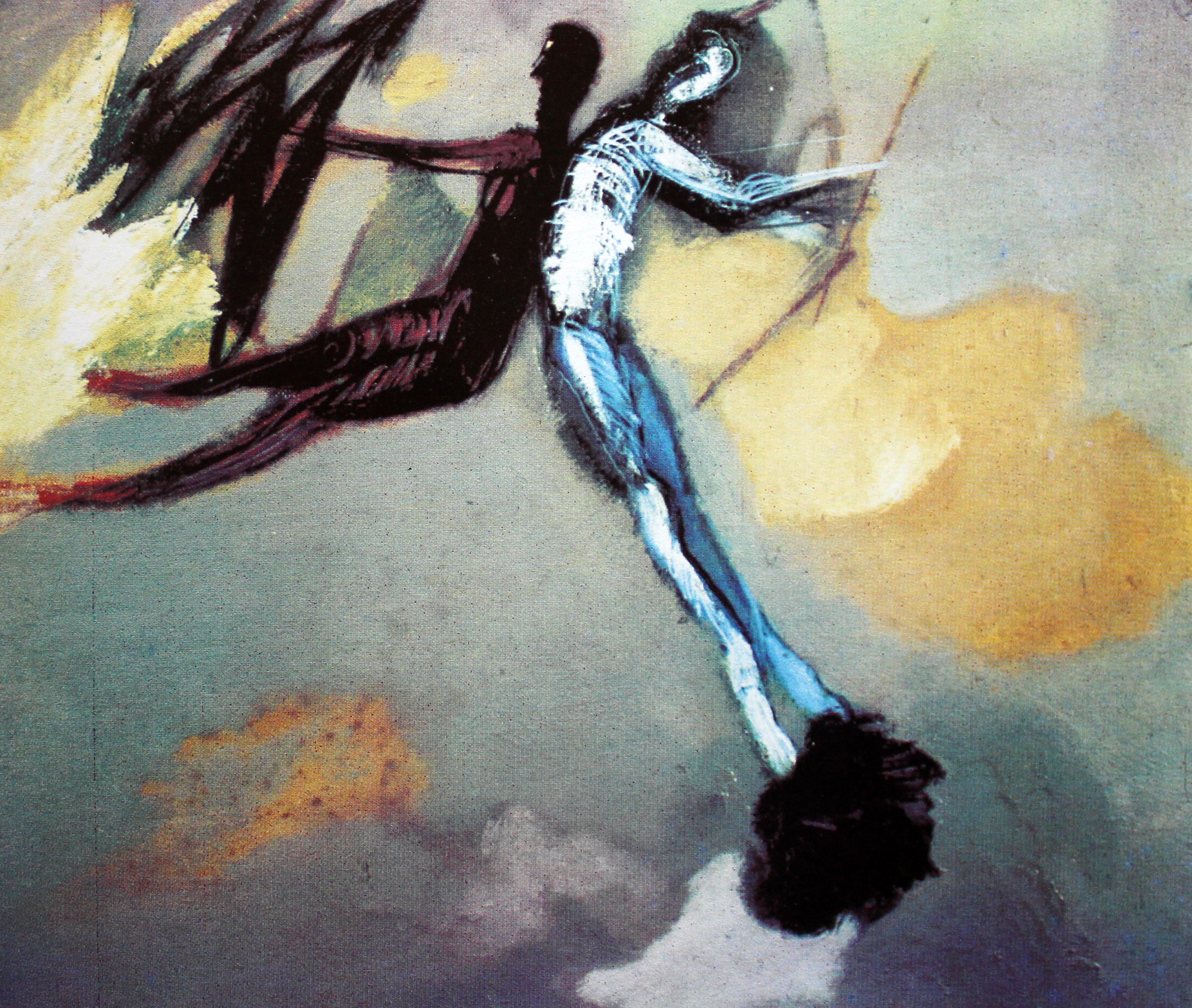
Muslim Mulliqi, The air meeting, 1975 oil on canvas, 50 × 40 cm

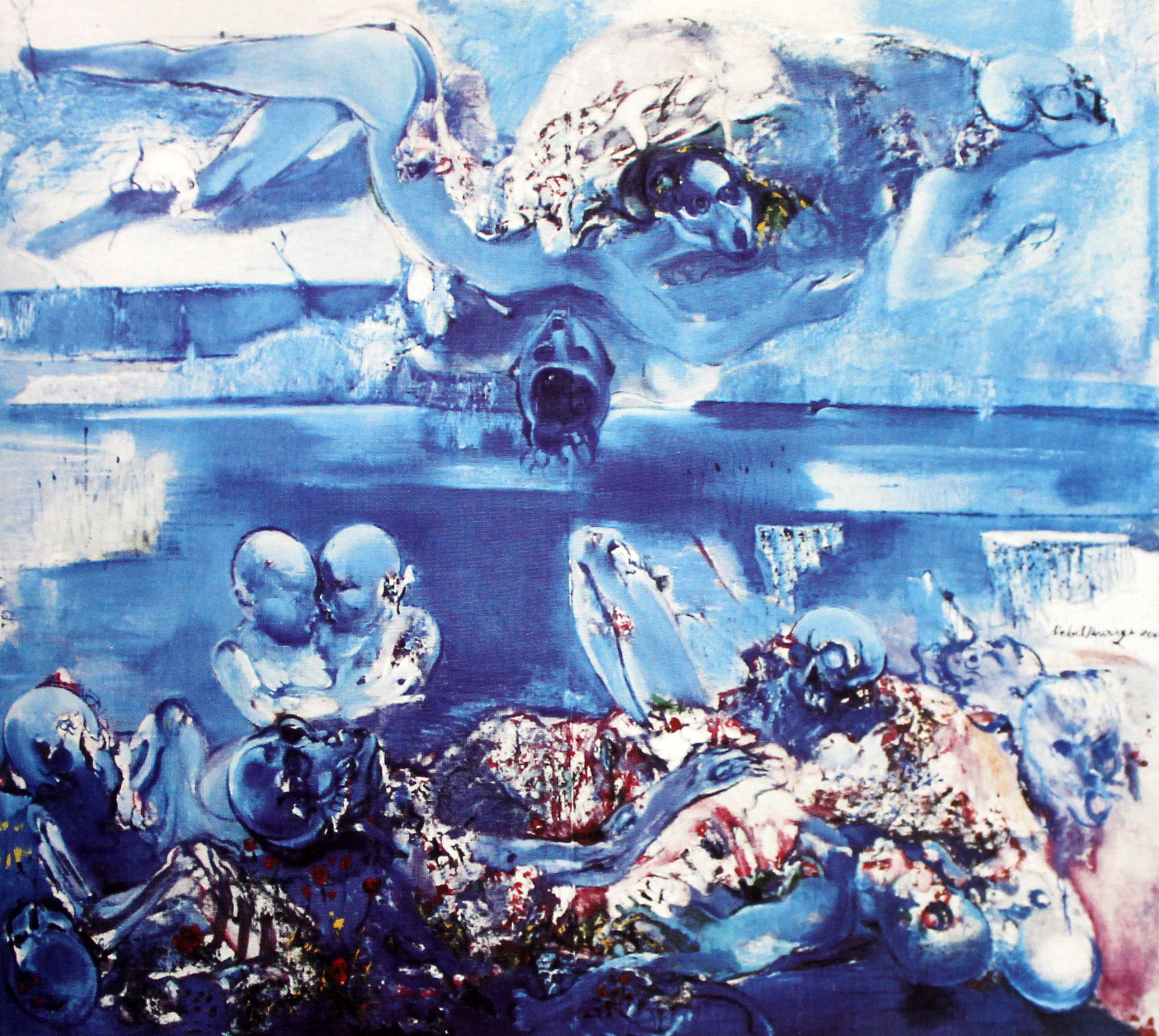
Nebih Muriqi, "Blue symphony", oil on canvas, 200 × 190 cm, 2000

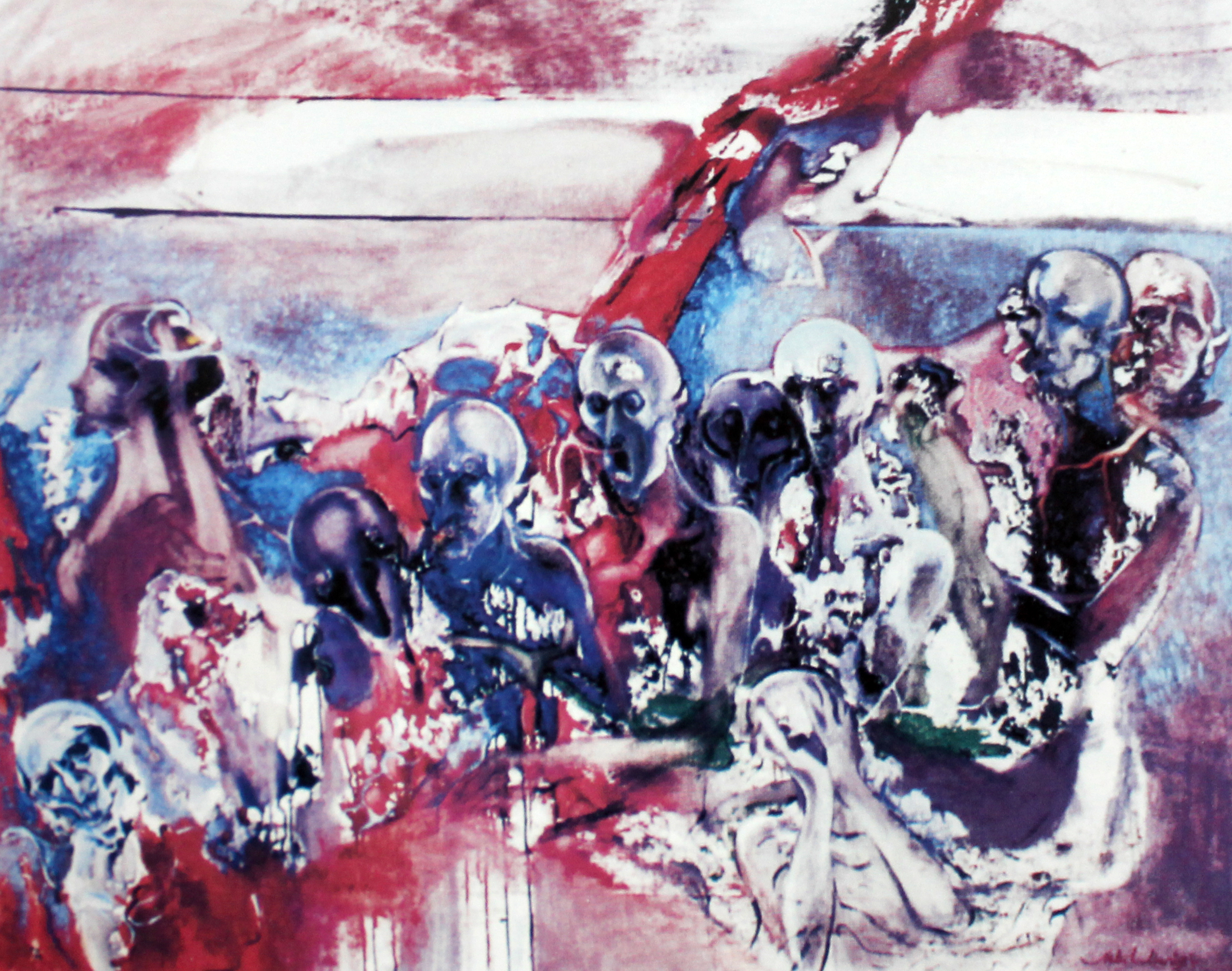
Nebih Muriqi, "Exodus", oil on canvas, 190 × 150 cm, 2000

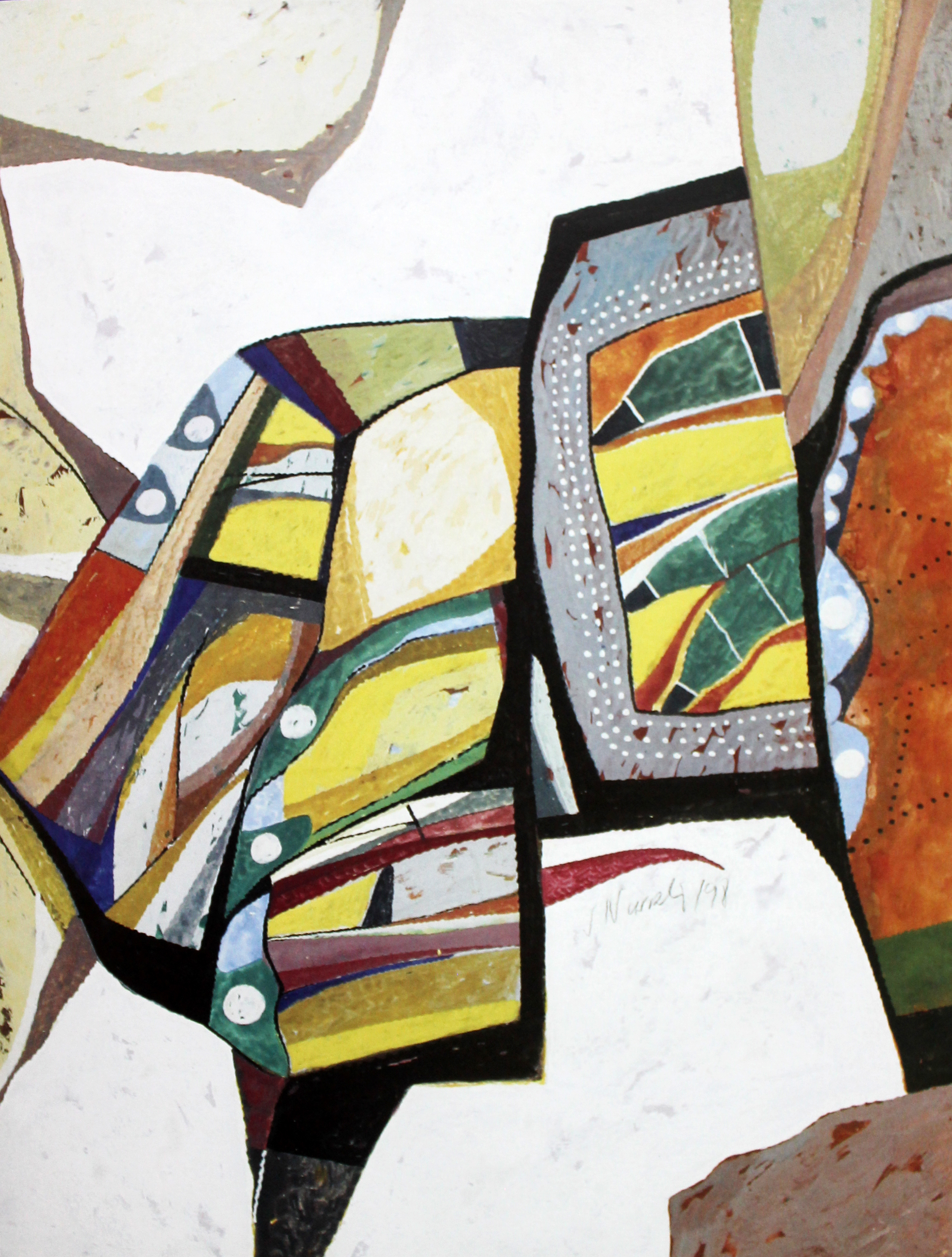
Nysret Salihmixhiqi, "Play I", painting on letter, 50 × 70 cm, 1957

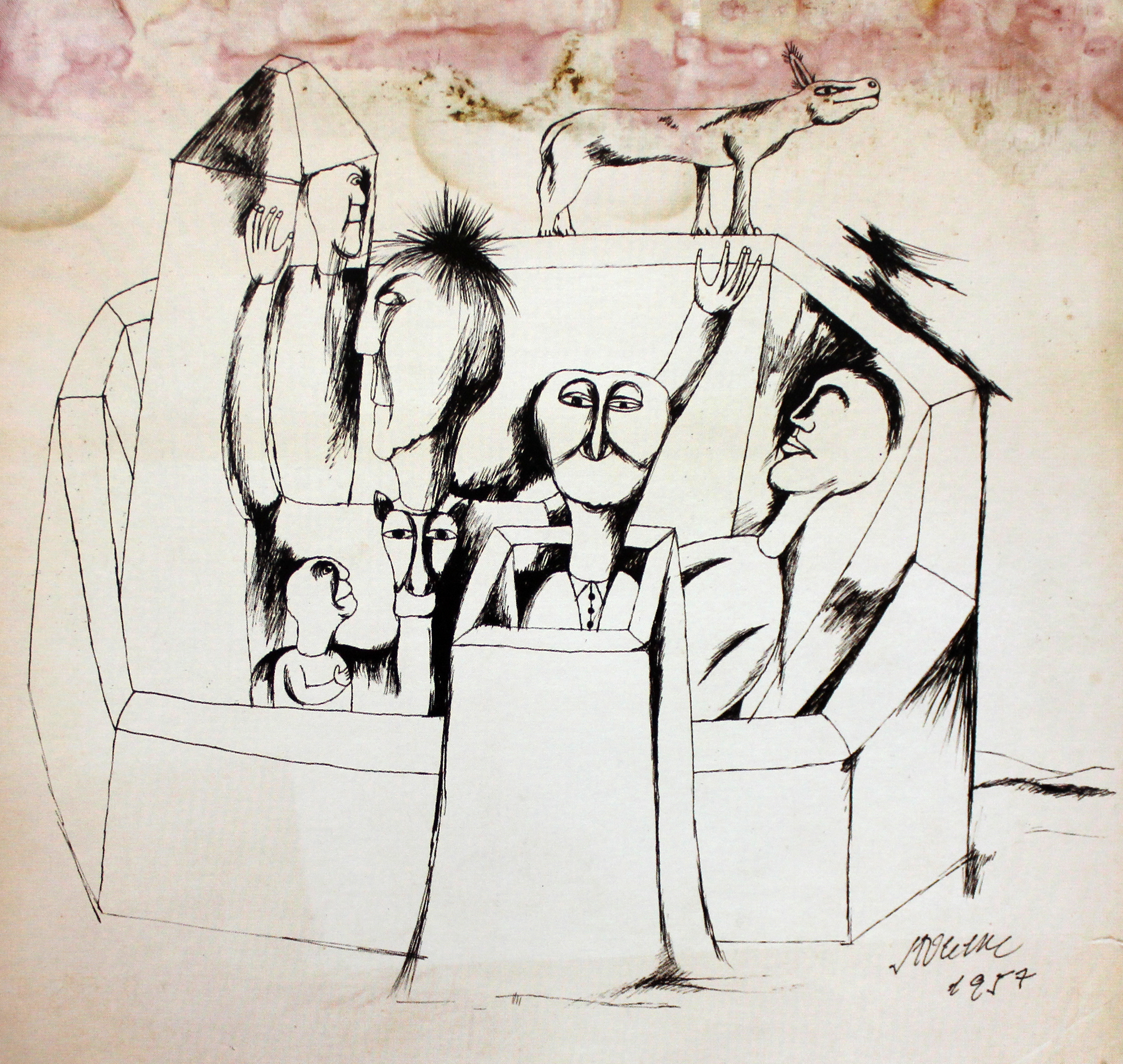
Nysret Salihmixhiqi 1971

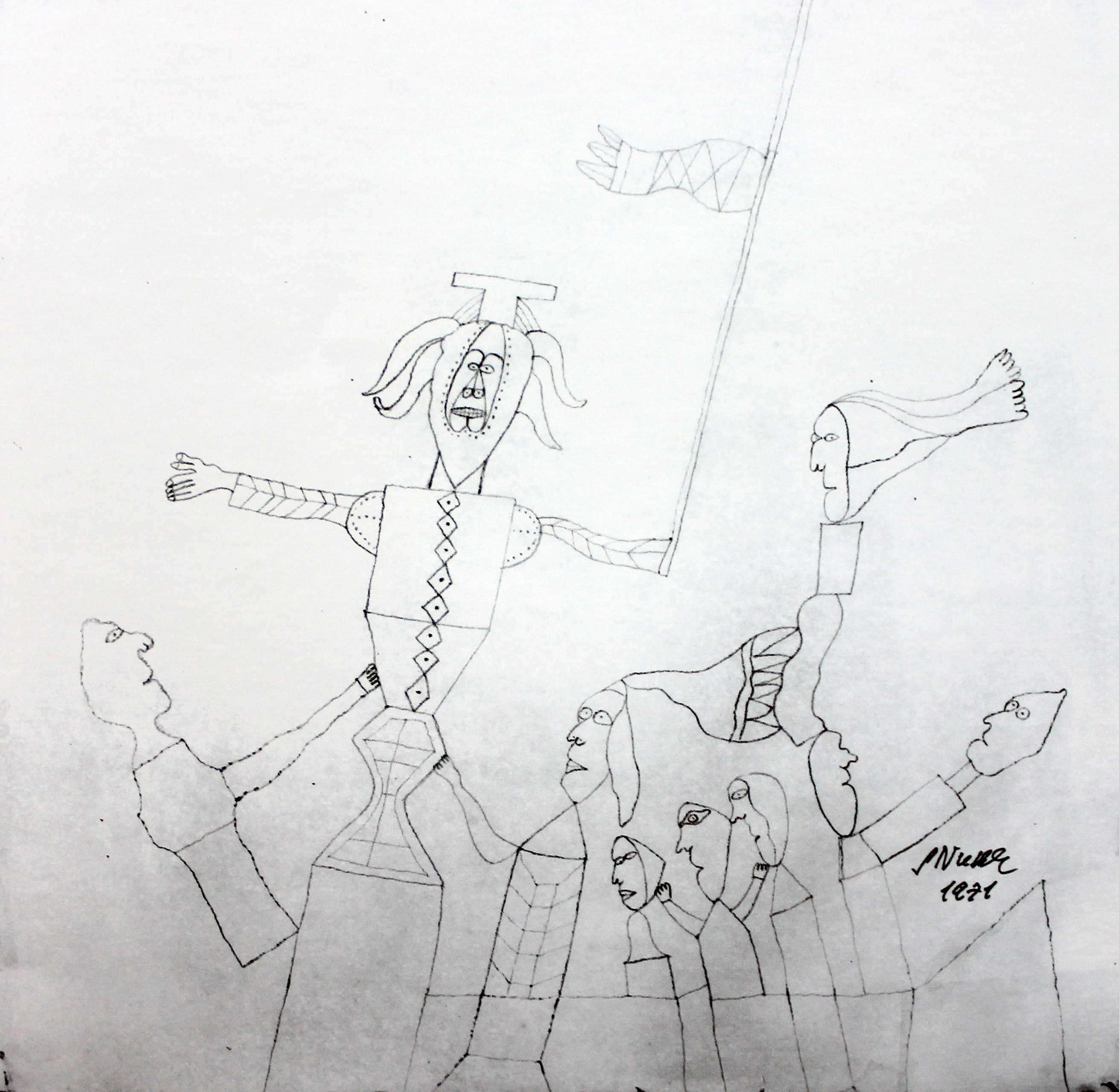
Nysret Salihmixhiqi 1950

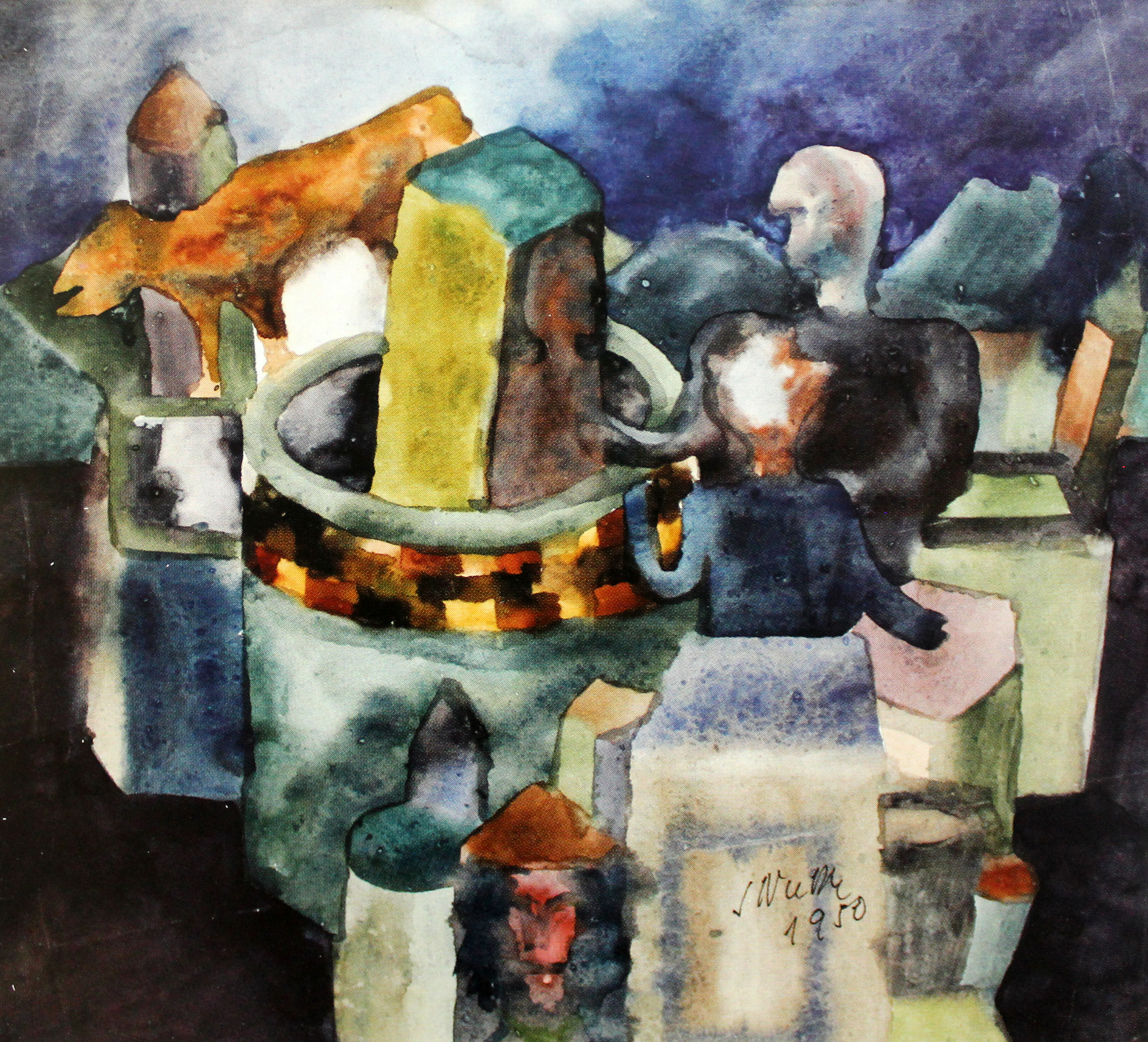
Nysret Salihmixhiqi 1950

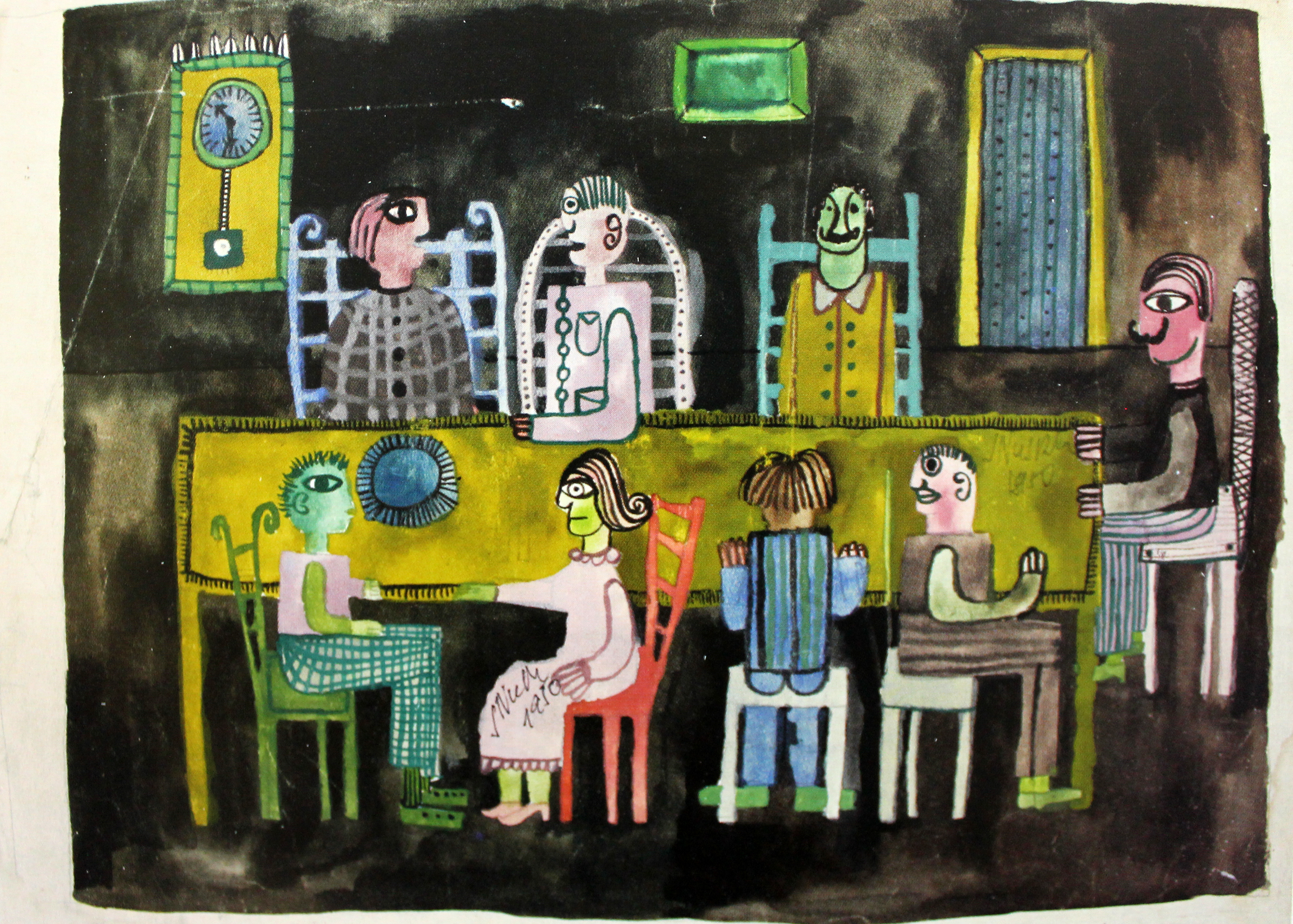
Nysret Salihmixhiqi 1960

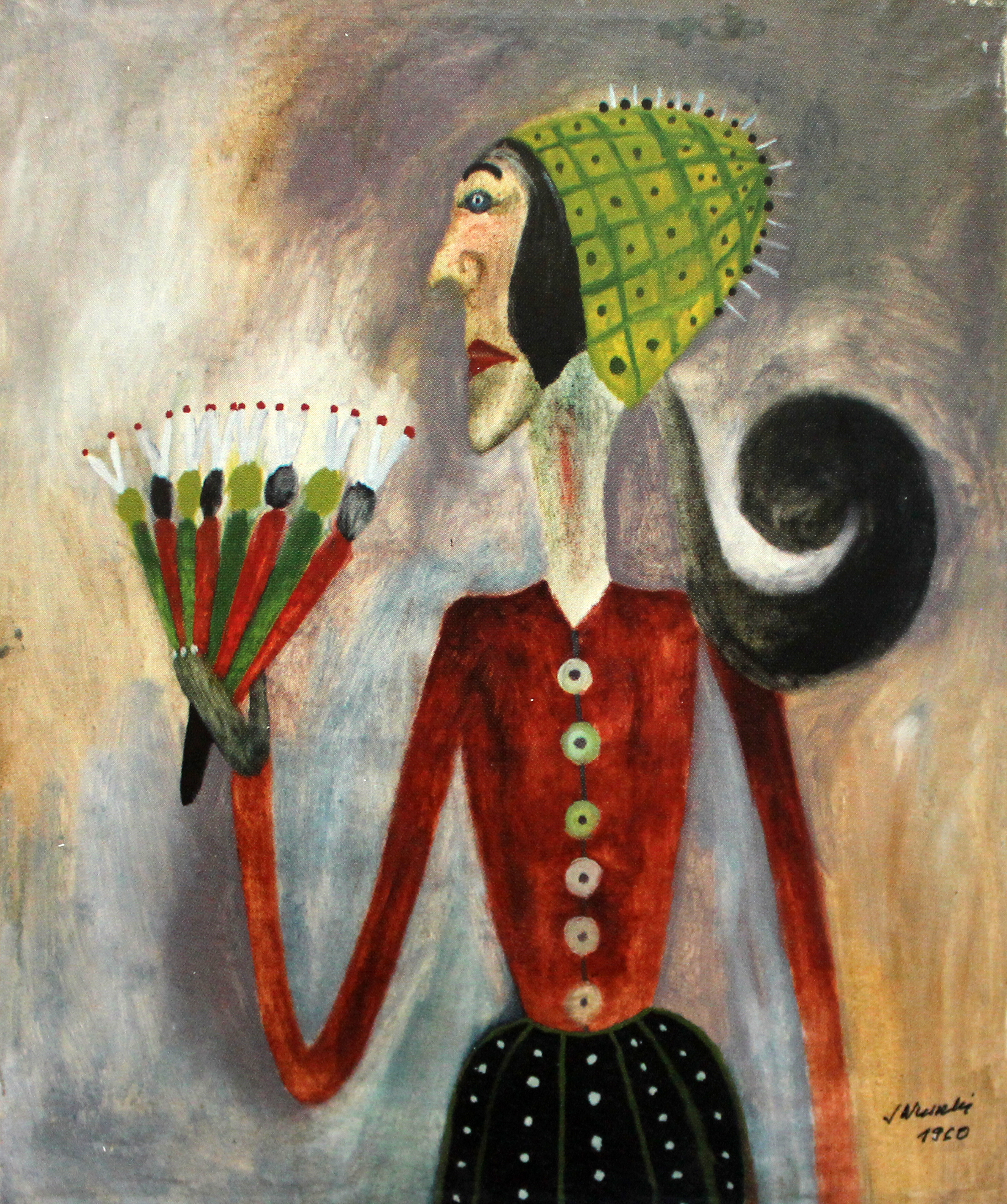
Nysret Salihmixhiqi 1960

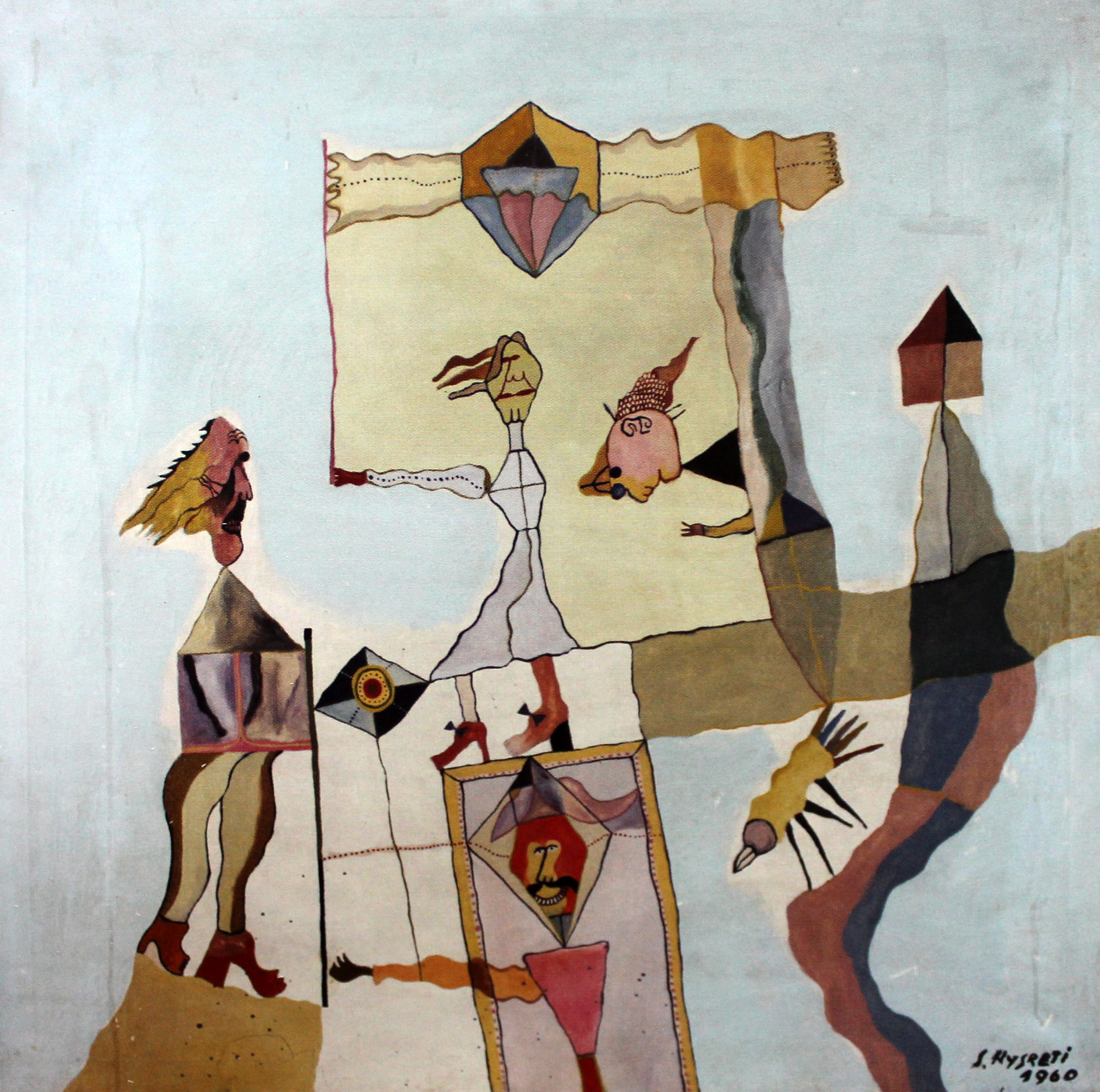
Nysret Salihmixhiqi 1955

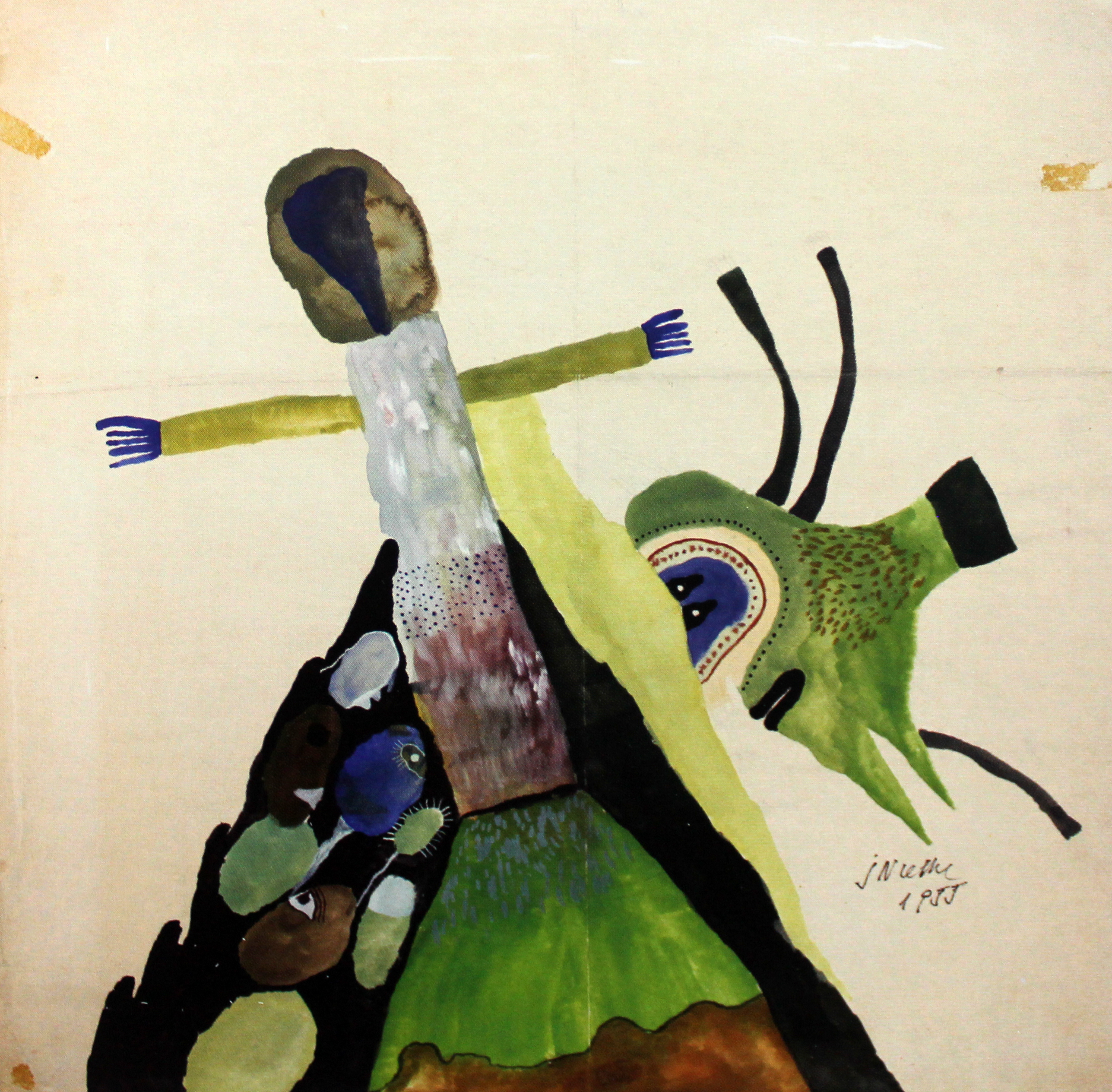
Nysret Salihmixhiqi 1963

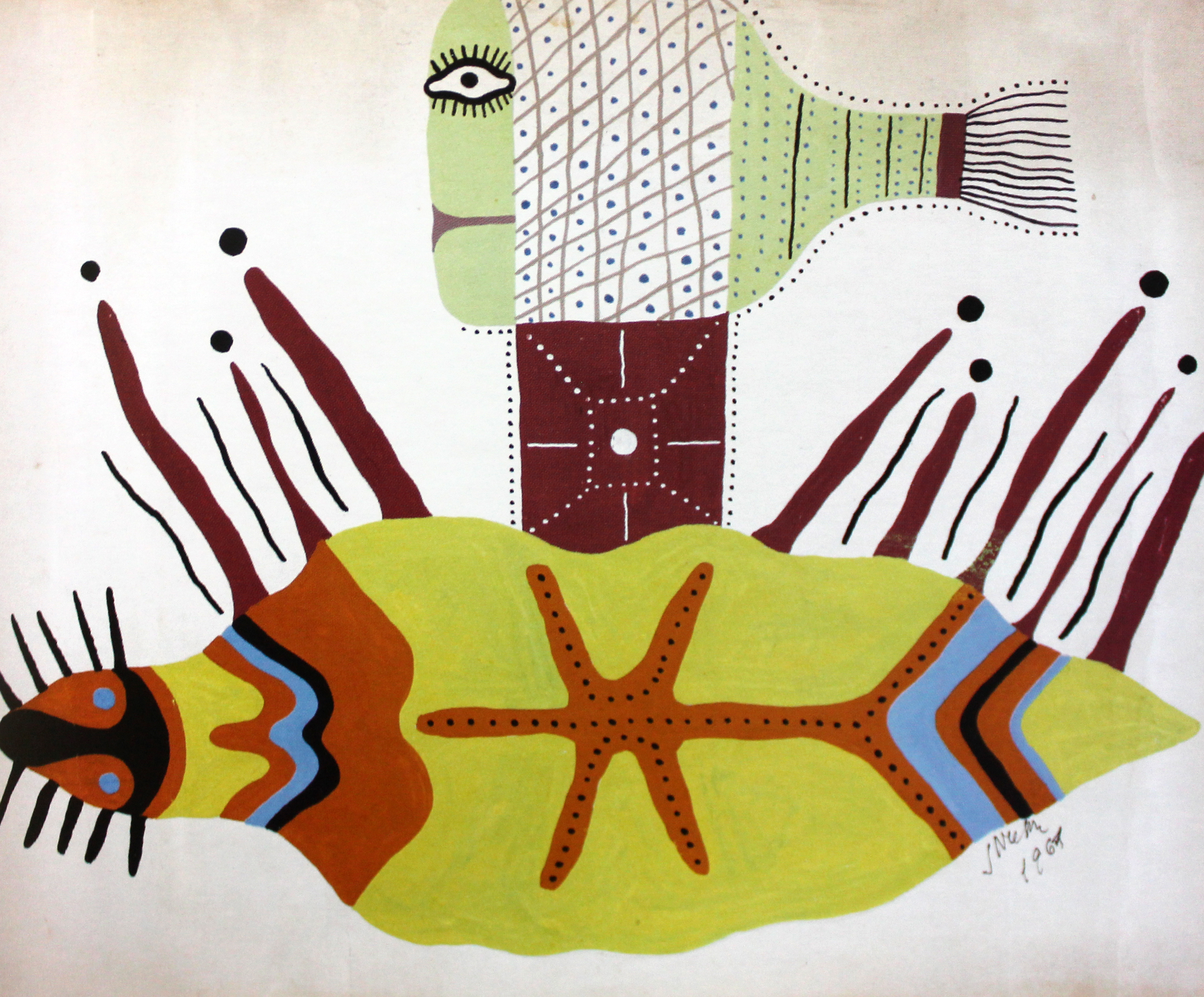
Nysret Salihmixhiqi 1960

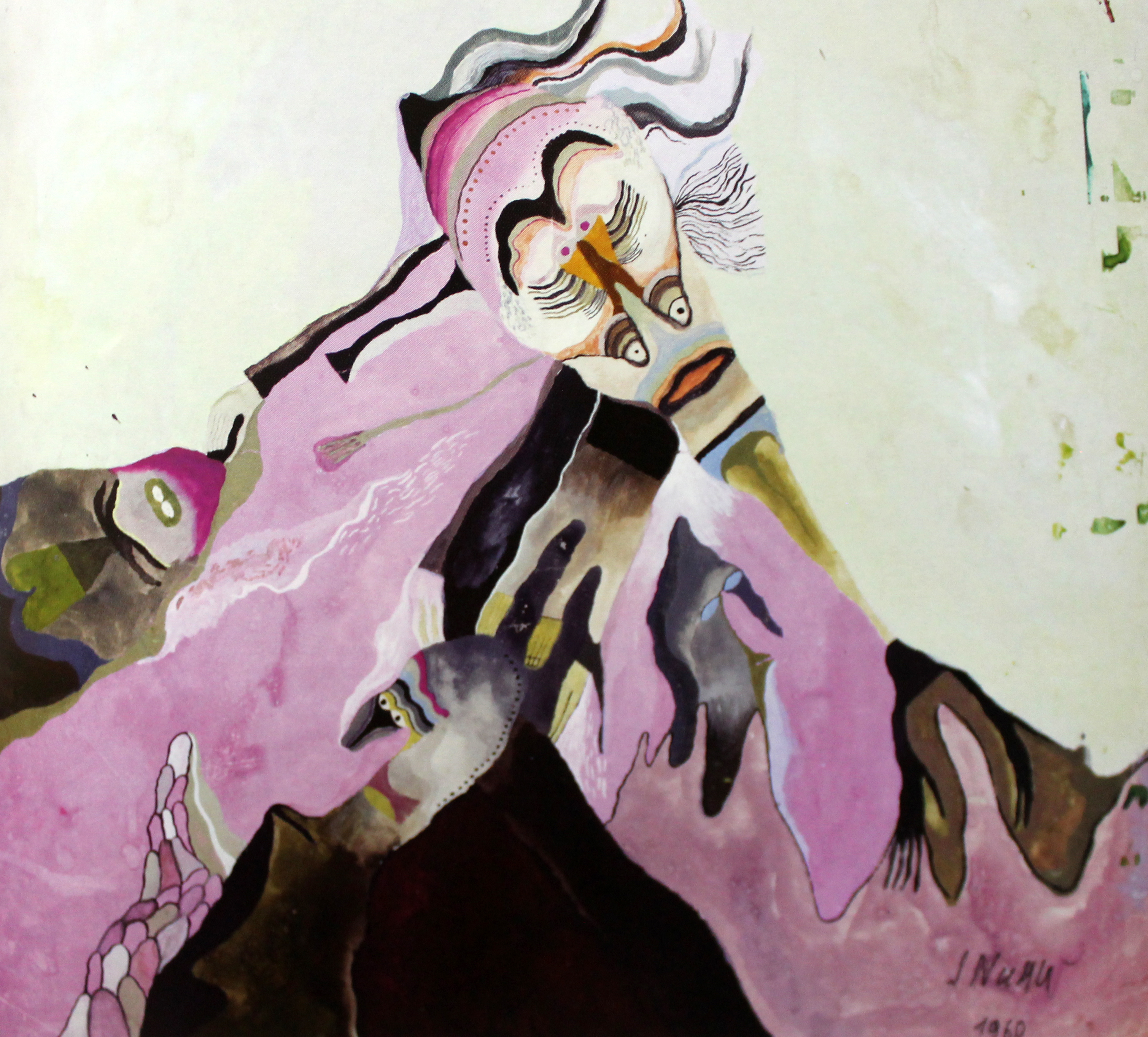
Nysret Salihmixhiqi 1963

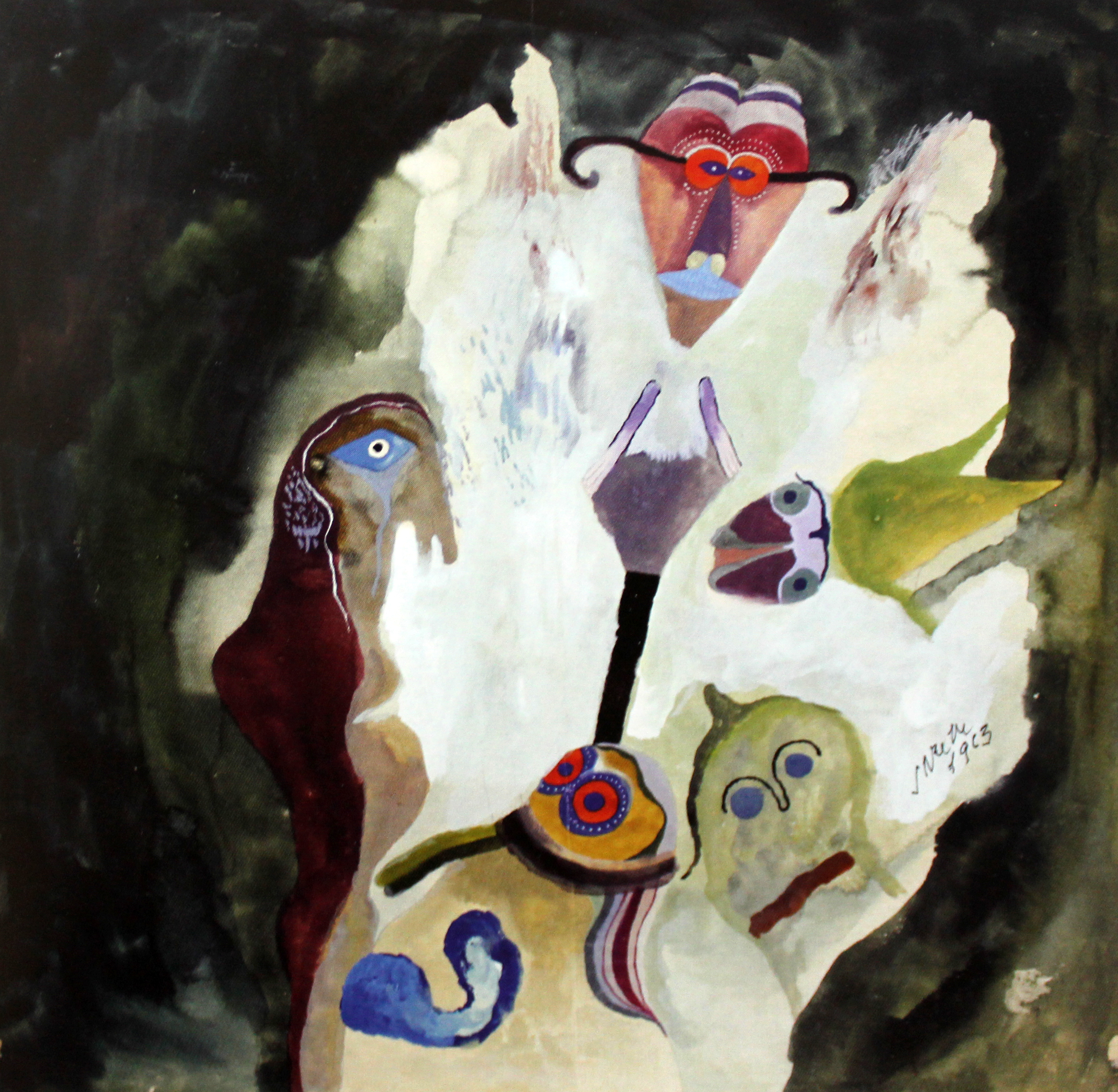
Nysret Salihmixhiqi 1961

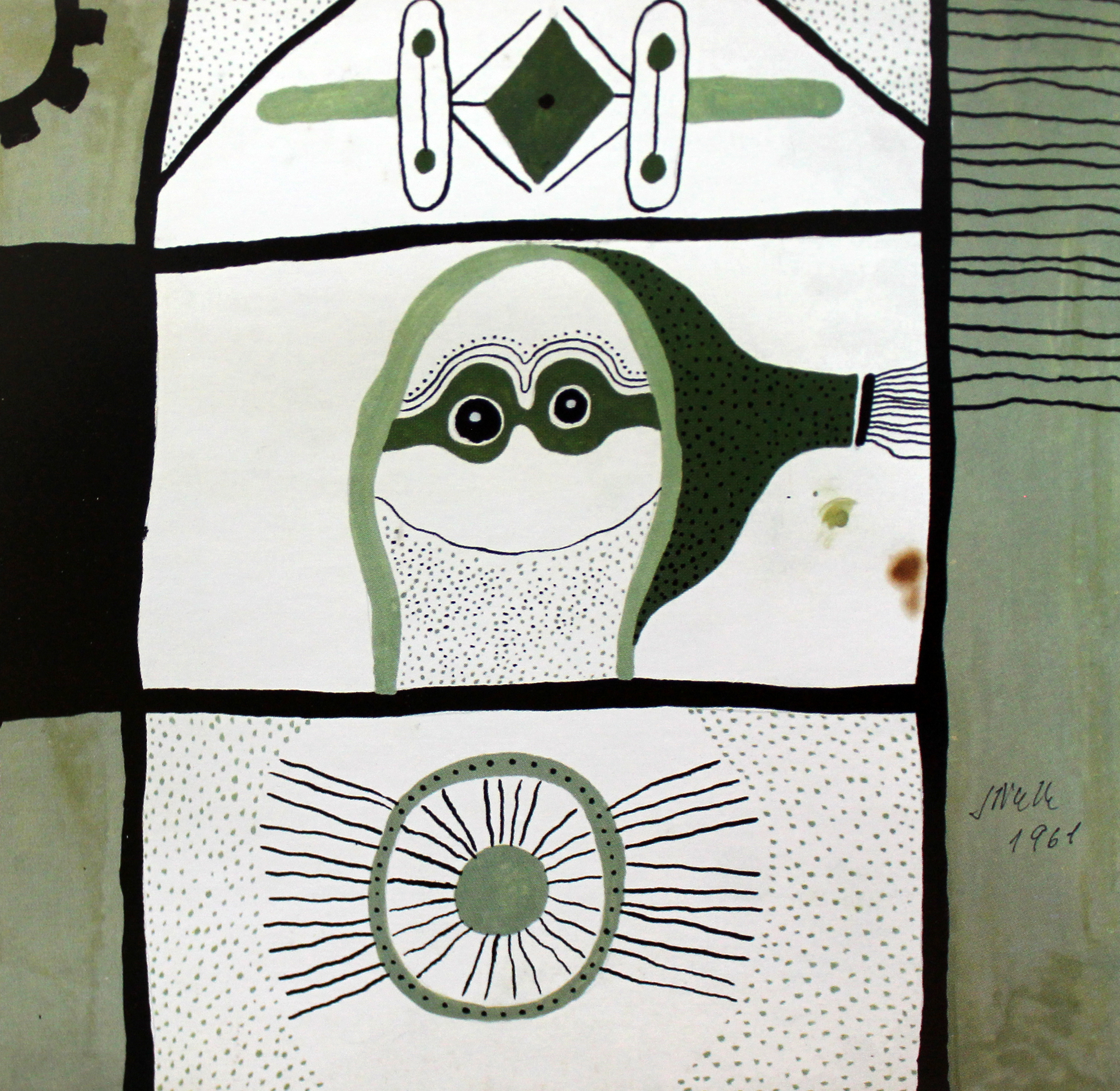
Nysret Salihmixhiqi 1985

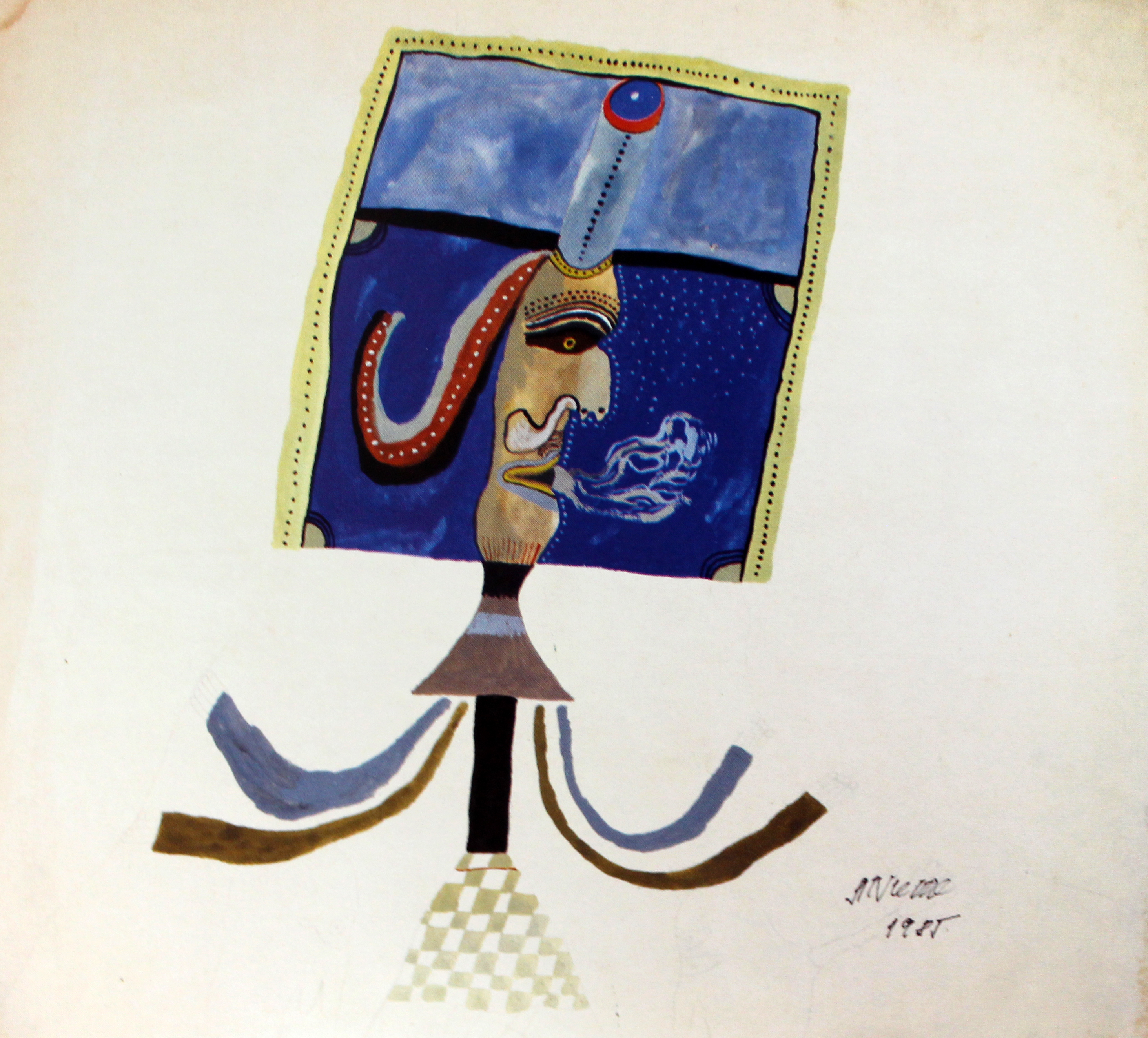
Nysret Salihmixhiqi 1970

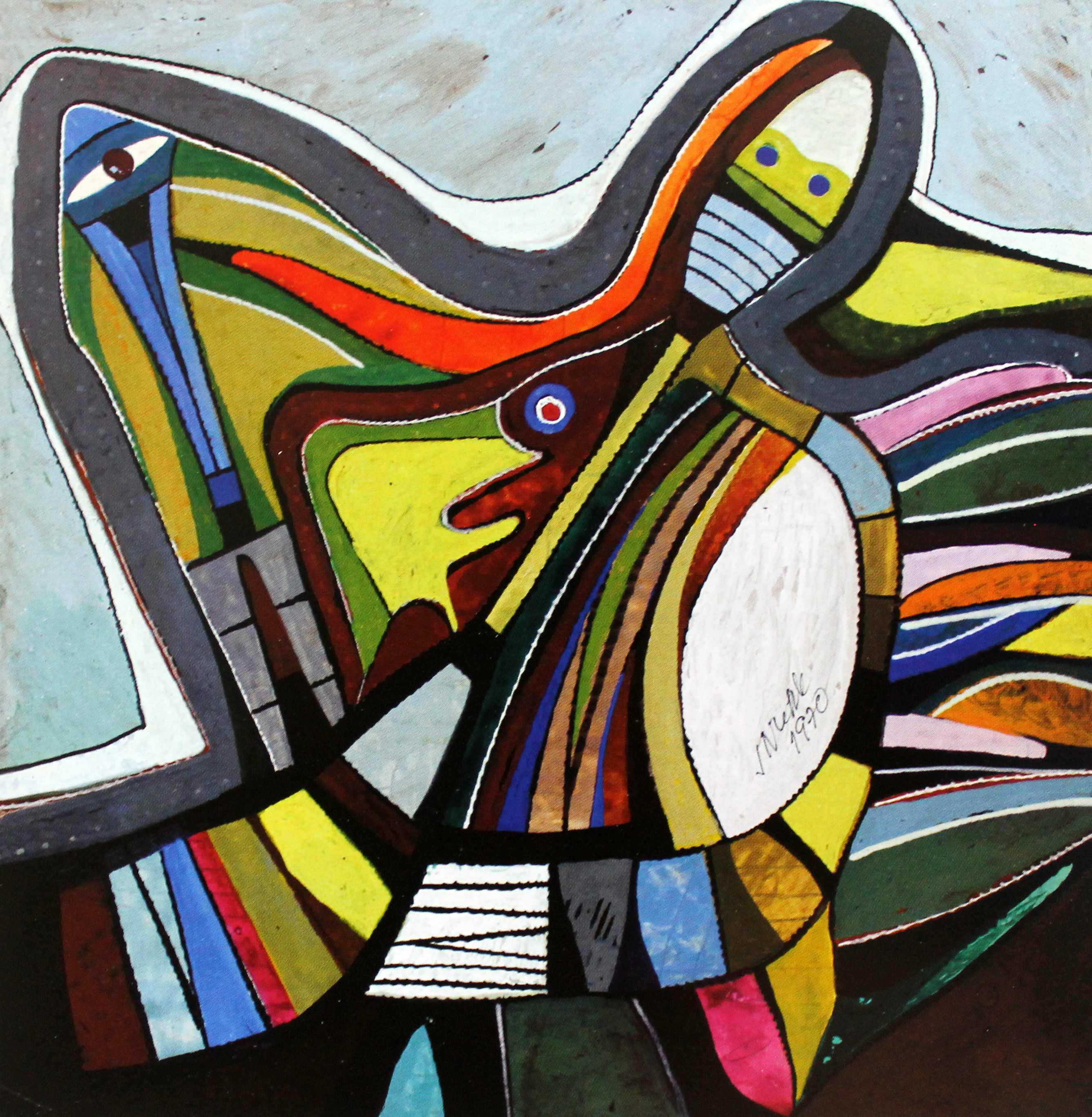
Nysret Salihmixhiqi 1967

Aziz Namani

== Facts about Pristina galleries ==
Personal Exhibitions: National Museum in Tirana (2006), Free Journey curated by Ismet Jonuzi, the National Gallery of Kosova (2010).
Group Exhibitions: Contemporary Art Exhibition at the National Museum in Tirana (2007), International Biennale of Drawing, Pristina (2010), Contemporary Art Center, Gjilan (2012).

Years	No. of galleries (Note: The Kosova National Art Gallery and the Ministry of Culture Gallery)	No. of exhibitions	Exhibited pictures	Exhibited sculptures	Exhibited applied arts	Exhibited artistic photographs	Fund works of art owned by the gallery	No. of graphics	No. of drawings	No. of sculptures	Visitors	Workers	Female workers
2012	2	30	-	-	-	-	-	-	-	-	9,894	16	3
2011	2	39	16	2	3	7	897	361	42	71	8,289	12	3
2010	2	33	10	1	3	7	887	360	42	71	43,000	12	3
2009	2	19	16	2	1	3	794	382	286	53	43,000	18	5
2008	2	42	16	2	1	7	795	382	287	125	49,900	18	5
2007	2	42	16	2	1	7	795	382	287	125	49,900	18	5
2006	2	41	18	2	12	9	730	345	186	199	54,378	15	4
2005	2	22	12	10	-	-	670	275	342	53	71,560	15	4
2004	2	22	12	10	-	-	670	275	342	53	61,384	15	4

== See also ==
- Culture of Kosovo
- Culture in Pristina
- Events and festivals in Pristina
- Pristina International Airport Adem Jashari
- National Theater of Kosovo
- Ethnological Treasure of Kosovo
- Archaeology of Kosovo
- Timeline of Kosovo history
