= Atmospheric Radiation Measurement User Facility =

US Department of Energy scientific facility

ARM User Facility
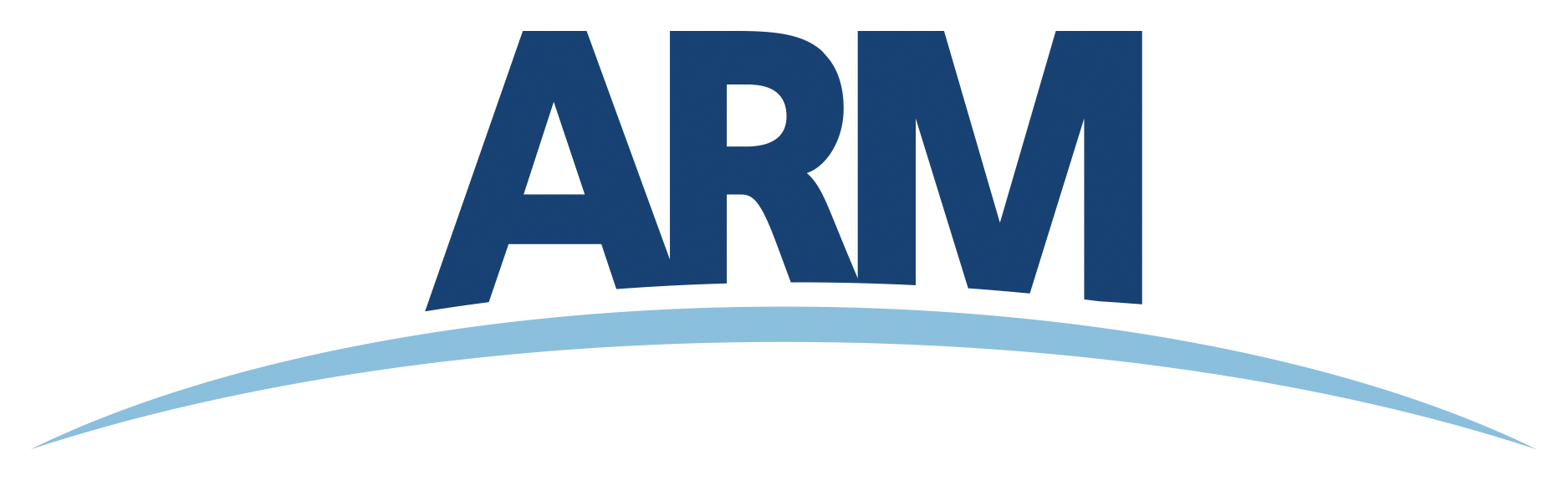

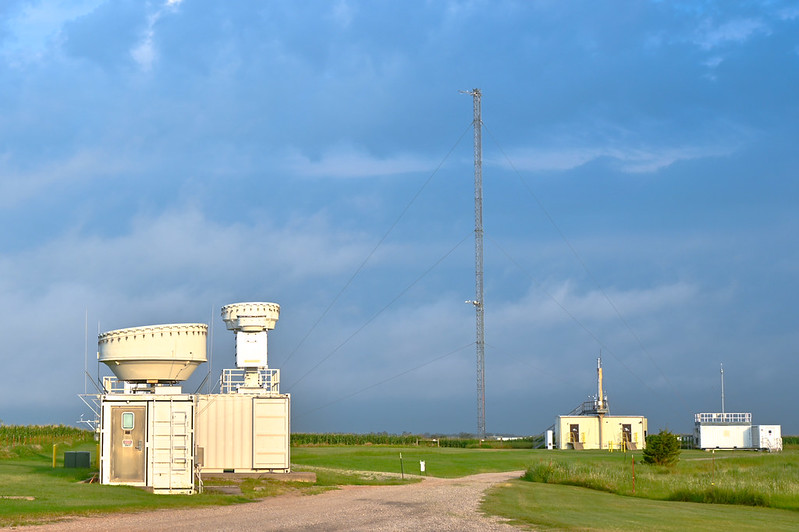
- Established: 1989
- Operating agency: United States Department of Energy
- Website: http://www.arm.gov

The Atmospheric Radiation Measurement User Facility (ARM User Facility or ARM), a multi-laboratory U.S. Department of Energy Office of Science user facility, provides 30-plus years of atmospheric measurements, including data sets from all seven continents and five oceans, to advance the understanding of the Earth’s atmosphere.

The ARM User Facility consists of three instrumented fixed-location atmospheric observatories, as well as mobile and aerial observatories. Continuous data from these observatories, as well as data obtained through intensive field research campaigns and value-added products, are available to scientists online through the ARM Data Center.

== Mission ==
ARM seeks to provide the atmospheric research community with strategically located atmospheric observatories designed to improve the understanding and representation of cloud, aerosol, and precipitation processes in earth system models in support of the U.S. Department of Energy’s science, energy, and national security missions.

== Atmospheric Observatories ==
Each ARM observatory operates a similar set of instruments for measuring clouds, aerosols, precipitation, the surface energy balance, and fundamental meteorological parameters such as temperature, humidity, and wind. To address the need for improved characterization and model parameterizations of atmospheric processes, ARM observatories are deployed to collect data in a wide variety of meteorological regimes worldwide.

=== Fixed-location Observatories ===
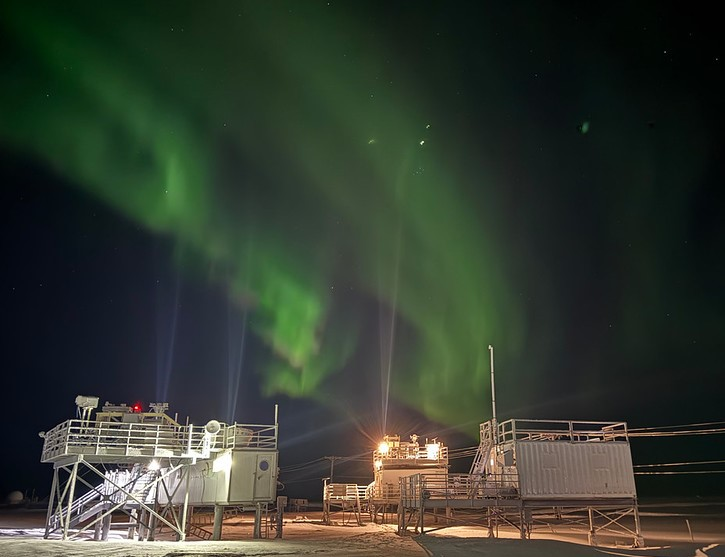
The aurora borealis (Northern Lights) is pictured above ARM's North Slope of Alaska (NSA) atmospheric observatory at Utqiaġvik, Alaska. Photo by Valerie Sparks, Sandia National Laboratories.

The Southern Great Plains (SGP) atmospheric observatory, which has operated since 1992, was the first field measurement site established by ARM. As of December 2025, the SGP observatory consisted of instrument clusters arrayed across approximately 2,900 square miles in north-central Oklahoma, supported by a central facility near the town of Lamont. More than 1,800 journal articles using SGP data have been published, the most of any ARM observatory.

The North Slope of Alaska (NSA) atmospheric observatory provides data about cloud and radiative processes at high latitudes. This observatory includes a central facility at Utqiaġvik (formerly known as Barrow), which has operated since 1997. From 2013 to 2021, an ARM Mobile Facility operated at Oliktok Point, about 160 miles east of Utqiaġvik.

The Eastern North Atlantic (ENA) atmospheric observatory has operated since 2013 on Graciosa Island in the Azores archipelago. The ENA observatory is in a remote marine area that experiences a wide range of cloud types, with marine stratocumulus being the most frequently occurring type. In addition, the ENA area receives air masses from several different regions, including North America, the Arctic, and northern Europe.

From 1996 to 2014, ARM operated the Tropical Western Pacific (TWP), atmospheric observatory to obtain data from within the Tropical Warm Pool. There, the warmest sea surface temperatures on the planet and widespread convective clouds play a large role in the interannual variability observed in the global climate system. In fiscal year 2012, ARM was directed to develop new sites in Alaska and the Azores, which led to the eventual wind-down and conclusion of TWP operations. TWP data, which are still available from ARM, have contributed to understanding of tropical cloud systems and meteorology, evaluation and development of models, and validation and improvement of remote sensing from satellite instruments.

=== Mobile Observatories ===
To explore research questions beyond those addressed by ARM’s fixed atmospheric observatories, scientists can propose a field campaign to use one of three ARM Mobile Facilities to collect atmospheric data from under-sampled regions.

Each ARM Mobile Facility is designed to operate in any environment for campaigns typically lasting about a year. A mobile facility consists of portable shelters, a baseline suite of instruments, and communications and data systems.

=== Aerial Observatories ===
In addition to its ground-based data, ARM provides airborne measurements required to answer research questions proposed by scientists. ARM aerial measurements are usually coupled with ground-based data to enhance the value of both types of measurements. Airborne observations provide validation of ground- or space-based remote sensing data, information that cannot be obtained from ground- or satellite-based instruments, and spatial context for surface-based measurements.

ARM currently collects aerial data using a midsize (Group 3) unmanned aircraft system and tethered balloons. In 2019, ARM obtained a Bombardier Challenger 850 jet, which is being modified to host research instrumentation, to replace its retired Grumman Gulfstream I research aircraft.

Before ARM began managing operations of the Gulfstream I in 2009, it collaborated with outside agencies and institutions such as NASA and the Naval Postgraduate School’s Center for Interdisciplinary Remotely-Piloted Aircraft Studies to obtain research data over ARM sites.

== Major ARM Instrument Classes and Measurements ==
ARM instruments measure key properties of aerosols, clouds, precipitation, radiation, and other atmospheric and meteorological variables.

=== Aerosols ===
ARM provides scientists with aerosol data to help them better understand aerosol processes, aerosol-cloud interactions, and aerosol impacts on the Earth’s energy balance for the purpose of evaluating and improving earth system models. ARM deploys and operates Aerosol Observing Systems to collect in situ aerosol measurements at Earth’s surface. Aerosol properties of interest include chemical composition, number concentration, scattering and absorption of energy, size distribution, and vertical profiles.

The following list describes some selected ARM instruments that provide data on aerosol properties:

- Aerodynamic particle sizers – measure aerodynamic diameters of submicron and supermicron aerosol particles, typically in the range of 0.5–20 micrometers
- Aerosol chemical speciation monitors – measure chemical composition and mass concentrations of non-refractory organic and inorganic submicron particles
- Cloud condensation nuclei particle counters – measure number concentration of aerosol particles that can activate into cloud droplets at a given supersaturation
- Condensation particle counters – provide number concentration of submicron particles; depending on instrument type, can count particles with sizes from 10 to 3,000 nanometers (fine condensation particle counter) or from 3 to 3,000 nanometers (ultrafine condensation particle counter)
- High-spectral-resolution and Raman lidars – provide vertical profiles of aerosols and clouds
- Micropulse lidars – used for aerosol and cloud detection
- Nephelometers – measure light scattering by aerosols at three wavelengths
- Optical particle counters – provide number size distribution for particles with optical diameters from 0.25 to 35 micrometers
- Particle soot absorption photometers – measure light absorption by aerosols at three wavelengths
- Scanning mobility particle sizers – measure mobility diameters of aerosol particles; depending on model, can measure particles with diameters from 10 to 500 nanometers (regular scanning mobility particle sizer), from approximately 10 to 800 nanometers (extended-range scanning mobility particle sizer), or from 2 to 150 nanometers (nano scanning mobility particle sizer)
- Single-particle soot photometers – measure black carbon mass and number of individual aerosol particles; ARM operates regular single-particle soot photometer and extended-range version, which is more compact, covers a wider size range, and outputs in geophysical units
- Ultra-high-sensitivity aerosol spectrometers (UHSAS) – measure optical diameters of aerosol particles from 60 to 1,000 nanometers

In addition, ARM operates systems to measure the atmospheric concentration of gases such as carbon monoxide, ozone, and sulfur dioxide.

=== Atmospheric State and Surface Fluxes ===
ARM collects measurements describing the physical and thermodynamic conditions of the Earth’s atmosphere. Such measurements characterize the atmosphere’s thermodynamic structure, processes that occur in the planetary boundary layer, and meteorological conditions at or near the Earth’s surface.

The following ARM instruments provide information on the atmospheric state and surface fluxes:

- Atmospheric emitted radiance interferometers – provide profiles of tropospheric temperature and water vapor
- Eddy correlation flux measurement systems – measure turbulent fluxes of carbon dioxide, heat, and momentum at the surface; system includes sonic anemometer, which provides fast measurements of the local three-dimensional turbulence field in combination with other instruments to obtain fluxes of the listed quantities
- Ground infrared thermometers – measure the equivalent blackbody brightness temperature of what is in their field of view
- Microwave radiometers – used to determine liquid water path and precipitable water vapor
- Radar wind profilers – provide wind profile data, including wind speed and direction at various heights
- Radiosondes – attached to weather balloons to measure profiles of humidity, temperature, pressure, and wind speed and direction
- Scanning Doppler lidars – measure profiles of horizontal and vertical winds
- Surface energy balance systems – estimate the total surface energy balance using net radiometer and soil sensor measurements
- Surface meteorological instrumentation – measures barometric pressure, relative humidity, temperature, and wind speed and direction at the surface

=== Cloud Properties ===
Clouds play a critical role in the Earth’s energy balance as they help modulate the flow of energy from the sun to the Earth and back out to space.

ARM measures cloud properties using the following instruments:

- Ceilometers – measure cloud base height, vertical visibility, and potential aerosol backscatter signals
- Cloud radars – provide information on cloud dynamics, microphysics, and structure
  - Scanning cloud radars – record details on the four-dimensional structure and evolution of clouds
  - Vertically pointing (zenith) cloud radars – provide vertical profiles of clouds at millimeter wavelengths
- High-spectral-resolution and Raman lidars – provide vertical profiles of clouds and aerosols
- Micropulse lidars – used for cloud and aerosol detection
- Microwave radiometers – used to determine liquid water path and precipitable water vapor
- Sky imagers – measure cloud fraction

=== Precipitation ===
ARM collects precipitation data to help researchers better understand the water cycle and how water moves from the Earth’s atmosphere to the surface.

Using the following instruments, ARM measures when, where, and how much precipitation is falling:

- Bulk precipitation gauges – measure the amount of liquid or solid precipitation over a specific time period
  - Types of gagues:
    - Tipping bucket rain gauges – collect and send precipitation into a container that tips after a specific amount of liquid enters to record how much rain has fallen
    - Weighing bucket precipitation gauges – measure the weight of accumulated liquid or solid precipitation collected in a bucket
- Disdrometers – measure the drop size distribution and velocity of falling hydrometeors
- Multi-angle snowflake cameras – capture high-resolution images of hydrometeors in free fall
- Scanning precipitation radars – allow for spatial characterization of precipitation
- Solid particles mass flux sensors – measure the horizontal flux of blowing snow
- Sonic ranging sounders – determine snow depth

=== Radiation ===
To improve understanding of the Earth’s energy balance, ARM measures the amount of energy from the sun (solar, or shortwave, radiation) reaching the surface and the amount of outgoing energy (infrared, or longwave, radiation) from the Earth. The planet’s energy balance is affected by interactions of incoming and outgoing radiation with the surface, atmosphere, aerosols, and clouds.

ARM collects radiation measurements with the following instruments:

- Atmospheric emitted radiance interferometers – provide measurements of downwelling infrared radiance from the atmosphere
- Microwave radiometers – measure microwave emissions of water vapor and liquid water molecules in the atmosphere at several discreet wavelengths in the 22–197 GHz range; data typically used to derive quantities of water vapor and liquid water
- Multifilter radiometers – measure irradiance reflected off the surface
- Multifilter rotating shadowband radiometers – measure components of solar irradiance in narrow wavelength bands; data typically used to derive aerosol optical properties
- Pyranometers – measure broadband (0.3 to 3 micrometers) incoming and outgoing shortwave radiation
- Pyrgeometers – provide measurements of broadband (3.5 to 50 micrometers) incoming and outgoing longwave radiation
- Pyrheliometers – measure broadband (0.3 to 3 micrometers) direct beam solar irradiance
- Sun photometers – measure direct solar irradiance and sky radiance in narrow wavelength bands at the Earth’s surface; data typically used to derive aerosol and cloud optical properties

=== Soil Properties ===
Soil measurements are important for understanding the exchange of energy and water between the Earth’s surface and atmosphere, as well as land-atmosphere interactions.

ARM instruments used for soil properties include:

- Soil temperature and moisture profile systems – provide vertical profiles of plant water availability, soil conductivity, soil moisture, soil permittivity, and soil temperature
- Surface energy balance systems – measure soil heat flow, moisture, and temperature

== Organization ==
Staff at the following nine U.S. Department of Energy national laboratories work together to manage and operate ARM:

- Argonne National Laboratory
- Brookhaven National Laboratory
- Lawrence Berkeley National Laboratory
- Lawrence Livermore National Laboratory
- Los Alamos National Laboratory
- National Laboratory of the Rockies
- Oak Ridge National Laboratory
- Pacific Northwest National Laboratory
- Sandia National Laboratories

ARM’s Infrastructure Management Board manages components of the user facility on a day-to-day basis, receiving oversight from ARM’s program manager at the U.S. Department of Energy. The Infrastructure Management Board, chaired by the ARM director at Pacific Northwest National Laboratory, also includes ARM’s associate directors for operations and research, chief data and computing officer, instrument operations manager, aerial facility manager, and observatory site managers.

== History ==
1989–2003

The U.S. Department of Energy created ARM in 1989 to improve the treatment of clouds and their influence on atmospheric radiative processes in earth system models, the main priority area of the new U.S. Global Change Research Program. During its early years, ARM focused on establishing field research sites, developing and procuring instruments, and developing techniques for both atmospheric retrievals and model evaluation.

Using a set of criteria provided by ARM’s site selection and management teams, a group of scientists recommended five primary locales in which to establish ARM measurement sites. Three of those locales—the Southern U.S. Great Plains, Tropical Western Pacific Ocean, and North Slope of Alaska—were selected for ARM’s initial site deployments.

ARM data collection began at the SGP observatory in 1992, followed by the TWP in 1996 and the NSA in 1997 to form a group of sites called the Cloud and Radiation Test Bed. In addition to the first TWP site, which was located on Manus Island in Papua New Guinea, ARM established TWP facilities on the island of Nauru in 1998 and at Darwin, Australia, in 2002.

To meet its measurement goals, ARM implemented a program to support the development and testing of instruments for routine, unattended 24/7 operation. Instruments that were a part of the program included the atmospheric emitted radiance interferometer, micropulse lidar, millimeter wavelength cloud radar, multifilter rotating shadowband radiometer, and Raman lidar.

Looking to enhance its ground-based measurements and improve model performance, ARM began conducting field campaigns with manned and unmanned aircraft. Sometimes, these campaigns aligned with periods in which ARM launched extra radiosondes to provide boundary conditions for single-column or limited-area models.

Starting in 1993, the ARM Unmanned Aerospace Vehicle program conducted 12 missions over 13 years. In 2000, ARM started carrying out routine research flights over the SGP with a Cessna aircraft.

Also in 2000, ARM established an office to centralize and standardize the data quality work occurring across multiple sites.

2004–present

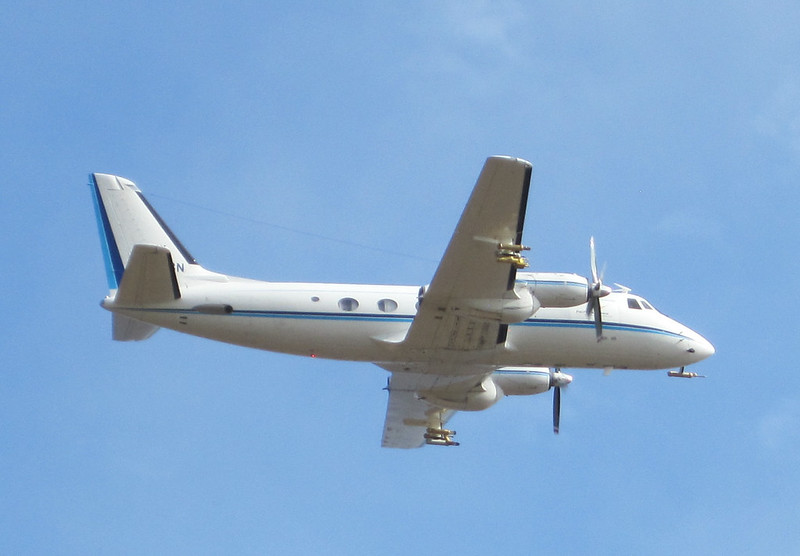
From 2009 to 2018, ARM operated a Gulfstream-159 (G-1) twin turboprop research aircraft that flew 10 campaigns for ARM in this time frame over multiple locations in the United States as well as Brazil, Argentina, and the Azores. Photo by Ed Luke, Brookhaven National Laboratory

In 2004, the U.S. Department of Energy designated ARM as a national scientific user facility to formally serve the broader global research community. The following year marked the first ARM Mobile Facility deployment for a field campaign, which occurred at Point Reyes National Seashore in California.

ARM established the ARM Aerial Facility in 2006 to consolidate its aerial activities under one organizational entity. In 2009, the ARM Aerial Facility began to manage operations of a Gulfstream I aircraft owned by Battelle Memorial Institute.

ARM consisted of infrastructure and science components until 2009, when ARM’s science component—largely focused on clouds and radiation—merged with the U.S. Department of Energy’s Atmospheric Science Program, which was mostly oriented toward aerosol studies, to form the Atmospheric System Research (ASR) program. While ASR was established to support research that combined field observations, laboratory studies, and process modeling, ARM was refocused on providing capabilities and conducting deployments that connected to ASR science.

Around this time, ARM expanded its measurement capabilities by adding a variety of new instruments to measure cloud, aerosol, and precipitation properties as well as surface radiative and heat fluxes.

The second ARM Mobile Facility entered service in 2010 with a deployment in Steamboat Springs, Colorado. Three years later, ARM started operating its third ARM Mobile Facility at Oliktok Point and opened the ENA observatory in the Azores. In 2014, ARM ceased its TWP operations.

ARM began tethered balloon system flights in 2015 within restricted airspace at its Oliktok Point site.

To further support modelers, ARM started the Large-Eddy Simulation (LES) ARM Symbiotic Simulation and Observation (LASSO) activity in 2015. LASSO combines ARM observations and high-resolution model output to help bridge the gap from single-point measurements to scales necessary for model evaluation and development.

LASSO initially focused on shallow convection at the SGP observatory, with the first data released in 2016. The SGP application of LASSO also included the addition of instrument modules that provided profiles of the atmospheric boundary layer to help constrain models. In the coming years, the LASSO activity expanded to cover deep convection in Argentina and shallow marine clouds over the eastern Atlantic Ocean.

In 2016, the American Meteorological Society published a monograph written by prominent atmospheric scientists and meteorologists about ARM’s first 20 years.

Gulfstream I flights ended in 2018, and ARM acquired the Bombardier Challenger 850 in 2019.

In 2021, ARM concluded its Oliktok Point site operations. A 2018 ARM Mobile Facility workshop had identified the Southeastern United States as a priority region of interest for further study by ARM, precipitating the move of the third ARM Mobile Facility out of Oliktok Point.

ARM marked its 30th anniversary of data collection in 2022.

In 2024, ARM conducted the first user-led field campaign with its midsize unmanned aircraft system. Also in 2024, the third ARM Mobile Facility began its Southeastern U.S. deployment in Alabama’s William B. Bankhead National Forest.

As of 2026, more than 18,000 ARM data products are available to scientists.

== Scientific Impact ==
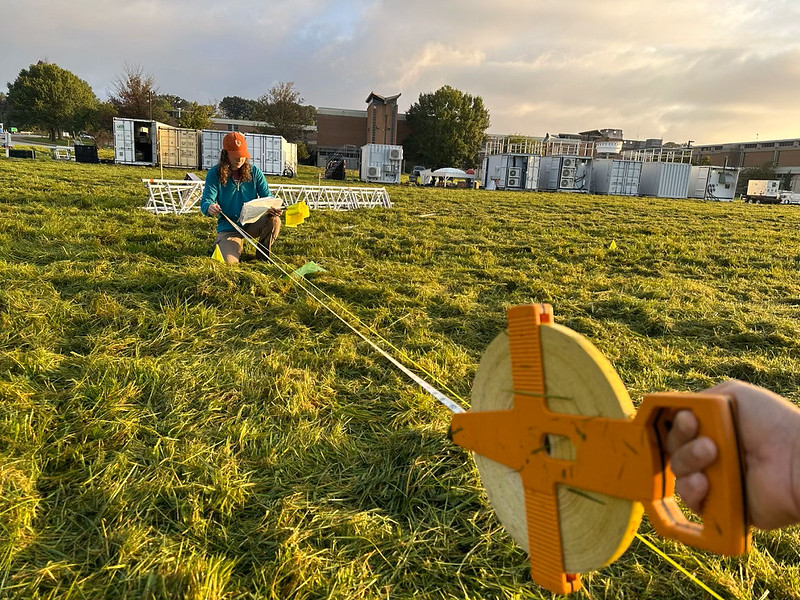
ARM site technicians install instrumentation at the site of the Coast-Urban-Rural Atmospheric Gradient Experiment (CoURAGE), a campaign that operated from 2024 to 2025 in Baltimore, Maryland, and featured the deployment of an ARM Mobile Facility. Photo by Juarez Viegas, Los Alamos National Laboratory.

Each year, researchers publish about 150 journal articles that use ARM data. ARM data have contributed to cited model improvements, as well as papers that have improved understanding of atmospheric processes.

ARM data have contributed to cited model improvements, as well as papers that have improved understanding of atmospheric processes.

Radiative transfer and cloud modeling

The U.S. Department of Energy initially tasked ARM with providing data to improve the representation of radiative transfer in earth system models. To achieve better models, it was seen as necessary to improve understanding of atmospheric radiation and its interaction with clouds and cloud processes.

Researchers used ARM data to develop a version of the Rapid Radiative Transfer Model that could run efficiently in global models and was more accurate than preceding radiative transfer models. This version has since been used in models developed by the U.S. Department of Energy, National Centers for Environmental Prediction, European Centre for Medium-Range Weather Forecasts, and Max Planck Institute for Meteorology.

Looking at profiles of water vapor, temperature, and cloud fraction, the Global Energy and Water Exchanges (GEWEX) Cloud Systems Study showed “reasonable agreement” between ARM millimeter cloud radar observations and most of the profiles simulated by cloud-system-resolving models. The study also confirmed that cloud-system-resolving models provide more realistic simulations than single-column models.

Using ARM measurements, scientists updated model inputs of water vapor absorption strength in the far-infrared spectral region, which is important for warming in the atmosphere. The updated inputs led to improvements in temperature and humidity profiles, as well as cloud amount in the middle and upper troposphere, in the Community Earth System Model.

An enduring challenge in earth system models has been accurate modeling of mixed-phase clouds, which are composed of both ice and liquid water. In 2004, ARM conducted a field campaign at the NSA observatory to help scientists better understand how microphysics, dynamics, and radiative transfer interact in mixed-phase clouds. Data collected by ARM have revealed differences between the Arctic and Antarctic in their mixed-phase cloud properties.

General atmospheric processes

ARM data have enabled greater understanding of atmospheric processes, such as those related to clouds and precipitation, and underscored needs for additional model improvements.

Using data from a 2011 ARM-NASA field campaign at the SGP observatory, researchers completed a pair of model intercomparison papers highlighting issues found in cloud microphysics schemes used to simulate convective up drafts and stratiform precipitation. Data from this field campaign and other ARM campaigns worldwide have provided insights into the life cycle of deep convective systems, from initiation to dissipation, and the environments in which these systems form.

In 2018, the U.S. Department of Energy released the first version of its Energy Exascale Earth System Model (E3SM). Researchers used ARM observations to evaluate a revised convective triggering function in version 1 of the E3SM Atmosphere Model, improving how the model simulates the diurnal cycle of precipitation. ARM data are now part of a case library used to evaluate and improve various models that have been released as part of the E3SM project.

Modelers have used LASSO cases from the SGP observatory to study the spatial organization of cumulus clouds and improve simulations of cloud size distribution. In another LASSO study, researchers analyzed SGP observations and noted a diurnal cycle of cloud-land coupling that co-varied with surface fluxes, but they found that LES runs overestimated cloud properties, highlighting a need to improve the representation of cloud-land interactions and boundary-layer processes in LES models for more accurate simulations of shallow clouds.

ARM data are used to study arctic cloud processes, including those related to mixed-phase clouds, and evaluate and improve their representation in models. Comparing ARM observations from Alaska with European Centre for Medium-Range Weather Forecasts model simulations, researchers found that the model did not agree with observed boundary-layer temperature inversion height and strength in the transition seasons or with low-level cloud fraction and liquid water path in the cold season. In addition, ARM data from the NSA observatory helped researchers uncover differences in the ability of single-column and cloud-resolving models to simulate multilayered and single-layer mixed-phase clouds.

Data from the ENA observatory have provided new information about drizzle in marine stratocumulus clouds. Using ENA data, researchers found that while about 80% of marine stratocumulus clouds drizzle, only about 30% produce precipitation that reaches the Earth’s surface. Another paper using ENA data noted that the evaporation of drizzle below the cloud base reduces turbulence below the stratocumulus clouds.

Researchers also use ARM data to learn more about aerosol properties and processes.

Using ARM measurements taken near Sacramento, California, researchers found that secondary organic aerosol is far more likely to form when emissions from both natural and human-made sources are present, rather than just one type.

In a study using ARM data from a yearlong field campaign in Brazil, researchers found that when pollution from the city of Manaus interacted with pristine rainforest air, this combination led to enhanced production of biogenic (naturally occurring) secondary organic aerosol by up to 400%.

Analyzing data from an SGP campaign on the occurrence of new particle formation events, scientists discovered that vertical turbulent fluxes of particles 3 to 10 nanometers in diameter could be used to determine whether the particles formed near the surface or in the residual layer, which forms at night above the atmospheric boundary layer.

With data collected during the Multidisciplinary drifting Observatory for the Study of Arctic Climate (MOSAiC) expedition, researchers characterized ice nucleating particles over a full year in the central Arctic. Results showed lower concentrations of ice nucleating particles in the winter and spring but enhanced concentrations during the summer sea ice melt, likely because of marine biogenic emissions from the open water.

ARM measurements have also contributed to understanding of aerosol effects on warm, arctic mixed-phase, and deep convective clouds.
