= Laser surface velocimeter =

Speed sensor

A laser surface velocimeter (LSV) is a non-contact optical speed sensor measuring velocity and length on moving surfaces. Laser surface velocimeters use the laser Doppler principle to evaluate the laser light scattered back from a moving object. They are widely used for process and quality control in industrial production processes.

According to J. Cimbala, in the case of laser Doppler velocimeter, the use of the term Doppler is a misnomer because no Doppler shift measurement is involved in the technique.

== Principle of operation ==
=== The differential Doppler process ===
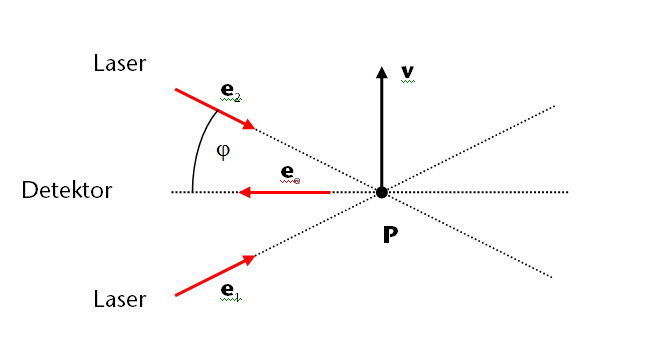
The differential Doppler process

The Doppler effect (or Doppler shift) is the change in frequency of a wave for an observer moving relative to the source of the wave. The wave has a frequency f and propagates at a speed c When the observer moves at a velocity of v relative to the source, they receive a different frequency f' according to

$$f' = f ( \frac{c-v}{c} ) = f \left( 1-\frac{v}{c} \right)$$

The above analysis is an approximation for small velocities in comparison to the speed of light which is fulfilled very well for practically all technically relevant velocities.

To make a measurement on moving objects, which can in principle be of any length, requires a measurement design with an observation axis for the sensor which is at a right angle to the direction of movement of the object under investigation.

Laser surface velocimeters work according to the so-called difference Doppler technique. Here, 2 laser beams which are each incident to the optical axis at an angle φ, are superimposed on the surface of the object. For a point P, which moves at velocity v through the intersection point of the two laser beams, the frequencies of the two laser beams are Doppler shifted in accordance with the above formula. At the point P of the object which is moving at the velocity v, the following frequencies therefore occur:

$$f_\text{P1,2} = f_\text{1,2} \left( 1- \vec v \ast \frac{\vec e_\text{1,2}}{c}\right)$$

$\vec e_\text{1,2,e}$ = Unit vectors of laser beams 1 and 2 and in direction detector

$f_\text{1,2}$ = frequencies of the laser beams 1 and 2

$f_\text{P1,2}$ = Doppler shifted frequencies of laser beams 1 and 2 in point P

The point P now emits scatter waves in the direction of the detector. As P is moving with the object, the scattered radiation in the direction $\vec e_\text{e}$ of the detector is also Doppler shifted. Thus for the frequency of the scatter waves in the direction of the detector, it can be said:

$$\begin{align}
f_\text{e1,e2}
& = f_\text{P1,P2} \left( 1 - \frac{\vec v \ast \vec e_\text{e}}{c} \right) \\
& = f_\text{1,2} \left( 1 - \frac{\vec v \ast \vec e_\text{1,2}}{c} \right) \left( 1 - \frac{\vec v \ast \vec e_\text{e}}{c} \right)
\end{align}$$

The scatter waves are superimposed on the detector. Due to the interference of the scatter waves from the two laser beams, there are different frequency components in the superimposition. The low-frequency beat frequency of the superimposed scatter radiation which corresponds to the Doppler frequency f_{D} is analyzed metrologically. When both incidental laser beams are at the same frequency (same wavelength), this is seen as a difference of f_{e2} and f_{e1} to:

$$\begin{align}
f_\text{D}
& = f_\text{e2} - f_\text{e1} \\
& = f \left(\vec v \ast \frac{\vec e_\text{1} - \vec e_\text{2}}{c} \right) \left(1- \frac{\vec v \ast \vec e_\text{e}}{c} \right)
\end{align}$$

If point P moves vertically with reference to the optical axis and at the same angle of incidence φ, it can be said that:

$$\vec v \ast (\vec e_\text{1} - \vec e_\text{2}) = 2 v \sin \varphi$$

and

$$\vec v \ast \vec e_\text{e}=0$$

This means the final result is:

$$f_\text{D} = \frac{v}{\Delta s}$$

The Doppler shift is thus directly proportional to the velocity. A graphic explanation which leads to the same result follows:

=== Graphic representation ===
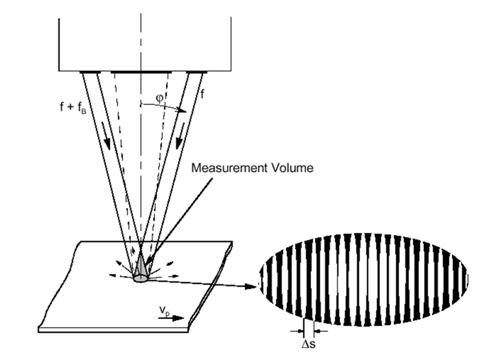
Principle of laser surface velocimetry

Both the laser beams are superimposed in the measurement volume and in this spatial area, generate an interference pattern of bright and dark fringes.

The fringe spacing Δs is a system constant which depends on the laser wavelength λ and the angle between the laser beams 2φ:

$$\Delta s = \frac{\lambda}{2 \sin \varphi}$$

If a particle moves through the fringe pattern, then the intensity of the light it scatters back is modulated.

As a result of this, a photo receiver in the sensor head generates an AC signal, the frequency f_{D} of which is directly proportional to the velocity component of the surface in measurement direction v_{p} and it can be said that:

$$f_\text{D} = \frac{v_\text{p}}{\Delta s} = \frac{2v}{\lambda} \sin \varphi$$

f_{D} = Doppler frequency
v_{p} = Velocity component in the direction of measurement
Δs = Fringe spacing in the measurement volume

=== The heterodyne technique ===
Laser surface velocimeters work in the so-called heterodyne mode, i.e. the frequency of one of the laser beams is shifted by an offset of 40 MHz, e.g.. This makes the fringes in the measurement volume travel with a velocity corresponding to the offset frequency f_{B}. This then makes it possible to identify the direction of movement of the object and to measure at the velocity zero. The resulting modulation frequency f_{mod} at the photo receiver in heterodyne mode is:

$$f_\text{mod} = f_\text{b} + \frac{v_\text{p}}{\Delta s} = f_\text{b} + \frac{2v}{\lambda} \sin \varphi$$

The modulation frequency is determined in the controller using Fourier transformation and converted into the measurement value for the velocity v_{p}. The length measurement is made by integrating the velocity signal.

== Applications ==
Laser surface velocimeters measure speed and length of moving surfaces on coils, strips, tubes, fiber, film, paper, foil, composite lumber, or almost any other moving material, including hot steel. LSVs can accomplish various tasks like cut-to-length control, part length and spool length measurement, speed measurement and speed control, differential speed measurement for mass flow control, encoder calibration, ink-jet marker control, and many others.

== See also ==
- Laser Doppler vibrometer
- Laser Doppler velocimetry
- Laser microphone
- Laser scanning vibrometry
- Optical heterodyne detection

== Literature ==
- Peter M. Nawfel: Laser based, noncontact speed sensor helps reduce breaks on high speed unwind. TAPPI, 2004.
- K. Matsubara, W. Stork, A. Wagner, J. Drescher, and K. D. Müller-Glaser: Simultaneous measurement of the velocity and the displacement of the moving rough surface by a laser Doppler velocimeters. Applied Optics, Vol. 36, Issue 19, pp. 4516–4520, 1997 (online).
- Bruce E. Truax, Frank C. Demarest, and Gary E. Sommargren: Laser Doppler velocimeter for velocity and length measurements of moving surfaces. Applied Optics, Vol. 23, Issue 1, pp. 67–73, 1984 (online).
