= Continuous-scan laser Doppler vibrometry =

Method of measuring vibration across a surface

Experimental setup for CSLDV test

Continuous-scan laser Doppler vibrometry (CSLDV) is a method of using a laser Doppler vibrometer (LDV) in which the laser beam is swept across the surface of a test subject to capture the motion of a surface at many points simultaneously. This is different from scanning laser vibrometry (SLDV) in which the laser beam is kept at a fixed point during each measurement and quickly moved to a new position before acquiring the next measurement.

== Advantages and disadvantages ==
CSLDV can allow one to capture the mode shapes of a structure with high resolution much more quickly than would be possible with SLDV. Allen & Sracic show results where measurements were acquired with CSLDV in a hundredth of the time that would be required for LDV. Allen & Aguilar postulated that the additional detail available from CSLDV might provide important information when validating structural dynamic models. CSLDV also makes testing with an instrumented hammer practical with LDV, and some have speculated that CSLDV might be useful in cases where it is impossible to recreate the input forces, such as explosive loadings.

The primary disadvantage of CSLDV is the additional laser speckle noise that occurs if the laser spot scans the structure too quickly. Speckle noise is caused by micro-scale irregularities in the surface that change the intensity pattern of the laser light received by the LDV as it scans the surface. Similar problems arise when applying LDV to rotating shafts, crankshafts for example. Speckle noise is difficult to predict, depending on the properties of the surface, the geometry of the structure and position of the LDV, so further research is needed to establish the limits of CSLDV.

== History ==
Sriram et al. seem to have been the first to publish regarding CSLDV, although they studied it for only a few years and discontinued research. Most of the subsequent advances in this area have arisen from the group at Imperial College in London by Stanbridge, Ewins, Martarelli and Di Maio, who coined the term "CSLDV".

Allen's research group at the University of Wisconsin-Madison began work in this area in 2006 and published the first output-only CSLDV algorithm and extended the Harmonic Transfer Function methodology by Wereley & Hall to CSLDV measurements.

== Application ==
Zhu's research group at the University of Maryland, Baltimore County applied CSLDV to structural damage detection and developed a damage identification methodology for beams that uses demodulation and polynomial methods.
