= Laser Doppler vibrometer =

Instrument for sensing microscopic vibrations of a surface

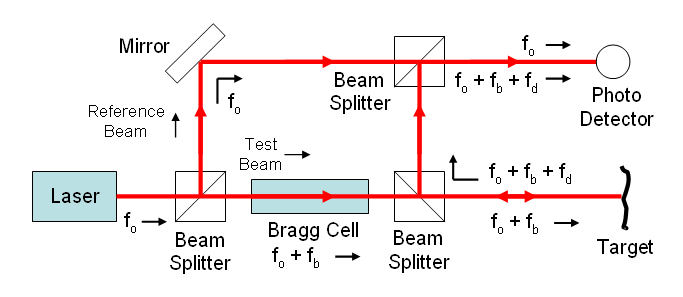
Basic components of a laser Doppler vibrometer

A laser Doppler vibrometer (LDV) is a scientific instrument that is used to make non-contact vibration measurements of a surface. The laser beam from the LDV is directed at the surface of interest, and the vibration amplitude and frequency are extracted from the Doppler shift of the reflected laser beam frequency due to the motion of the surface. The output of an LDV is generally a continuous analog voltage that is directly proportional to the target velocity component along the direction of the laser beam.

Some advantages of an LDV over similar measurement devices such as an accelerometer are that the LDV can be directed at targets that are difficult to access, or that may be too small or too hot to attach a physical transducer. Also, the LDV makes the vibration measurement without mass-loading the target, which is especially important for MEMS devices.

== Principles of operation ==
A vibrometer is generally a two beam laser interferometer that measures the frequency (or phase) difference between an internal reference beam and a test beam. The most common type of laser in an LDV is the helium–neon laser, although laser diodes, fiber lasers, and Nd:YAG lasers are also used. The test beam is directed to the target, and scattered light from the target is collected and interfered with the reference beam on a photodetector, typically a photodiode. Most commercial vibrometers work in a heterodyne regime by adding a known frequency shift (typically 30–40 MHz) to one of the beams. This frequency shift is usually generated by a Bragg cell, or acousto-optic modulator.

A schematic of a typical laser vibrometer is shown above. The beam from the laser, which has a frequency f_{o}, is divided into a reference beam and a test beam with a beamsplitter. The test beam then passes through the Bragg cell, which adds a frequency shift f_{b}. This frequency shifted beam then is directed to the target. The motion of the target adds a Doppler shift to the beam given by $f_d = \frac{2 v(t) \cos(\alpha)}{\lambda}$, where v(t) is the velocity of the target as a function of time, α is the angle between the laser beam and the velocity vector, and λ is the wavelength of the light.

Light scatters from the target in all directions, but some portion of the light is collected by the LDV and reflected by the beamsplitter to the photodetector. This light has a frequency equal to f_{o} + f_{b} + f_{d}. This scattered light is combined with the reference beam at the photo-detector. The initial frequency of the laser is very high (> 10^{14} Hz), which is higher than the response of the detector. The detector does respond, however, to the beat frequency between the two beams, which is at f_{b} + f_{d} (typically in the tens of MHz range).

The output of the photodetector is a standard frequency modulated (FM) signal, with the Bragg cell frequency as the carrier frequency, and the Doppler shift as the modulation frequency. This signal can be demodulated to derive the velocity vs. time of the vibrating target.

== Applications ==
LDVs are used in a wide variety of scientific, industrial, and medical applications. Some examples are provided below:

- Aerospace – LDVs are being used as tools in non-destructive inspection of aircraft components.
- Acoustic – LDVs are standard tools for speaker design, and have also been used to diagnose the performance of musical instruments.
- Architectural – LDVs are being used for bridge and structure vibration tests.
- Automotive – LDVs have been used extensively in many automotive applications, such as structural dynamics, brake diagnostics, and quantification of Noise, vibration, and harshness (NVH), measurement of accurate speed.
- Biological – LDVs have been used for diverse applications such as eardrum diagnostics and insect communication.
- Calibration – Since LDVs measure motion that can be calibrated directly to the wavelength of light, they are frequently used to calibrate other types of transducers.
- Hard disk drive diagnostics – LDVs have been used extensively in the analysis of hard disk drives, specifically in the area of head positioning.
- Dental Devices - LDVs are used in the dental industry to measure the vibration signature of dental scalers to improve vibration quality.
- Landmine detection – LDVs have shown great promise in the detection of buried landmines. The technique uses an audio source such as a loudspeaker to excite the ground, causing the ground to vibrate a very small amount with the LDV used to measure the amplitude of the ground vibrations. Areas above a buried mine show an enhanced ground velocity at the resonance frequency of the mine-soil system. Mine detection with single-beam scanning LDVs, an array of LDVs, and multi-beam LDVs has been demonstrated.
- Security – Laser Doppler vibrometers (LDVs) as non-contact vibration sensors have an ability of remote voice acquisition. With the assistance of a visual sensor (camera), various targets in the environment, where an audio event takes place, can be selected as reflecting surfaces for collecting acoustic signals by an LDV. The performance of the LDV greatly depends on the vibration characteristics of the selected targets (surfaces) in the scene, on which a laser beam strikes and from which it returns.
- Materials Research – Due to the non-contact method, Laser Vibrometers, especially Laser Scanning Vibrometers, can measure surface vibrations of modern materials like carbon plates. The vibration information can help identify and study defects as materials with defects will show a different vibration profile compared to materials without defect.
- Explosive detection – Photoacoustic Sensing of Explosives (PHASE) is technology that detects trace explosive residues from significant standoff distances, providing early warning of concealed threats targeting civilians, military personnel, and public facilities. PHASE exploits photoacoustic phenomena resulting from ultraviolet laser excitation. The system applies principles from atmospheric LIDAR: the high peak power of a modulated UV laser causes explosives to dissociate and vaporize into the surrounding atmosphere, generating intense, localized pressure fluctuations. These fluctuations create ultrasonic waves that cause atmospheric disturbances, which are then detected remotely using a laser Doppler vibrometer, processed via optical heterodyne detection, and analyzed using specialized algorithms. By employing a UV laser, the PHASE system can excite explosive materials located up to 100 meters away.

== Types ==
- Single-point vibrometers – This is the most common type of LDV. It can measure one directional out of plane movement.
- Scanning vibrometers – A scanning LDV adds a set of X-Y scanning mirrors, allowing the single laser beam to be moved across the surface of interest.
- Holographic laser Doppler vibrometry (HLDV) – An extended-illumination LDV that relies on digital holography for image rendering to capture the motion of a surface at many points simultaneously.

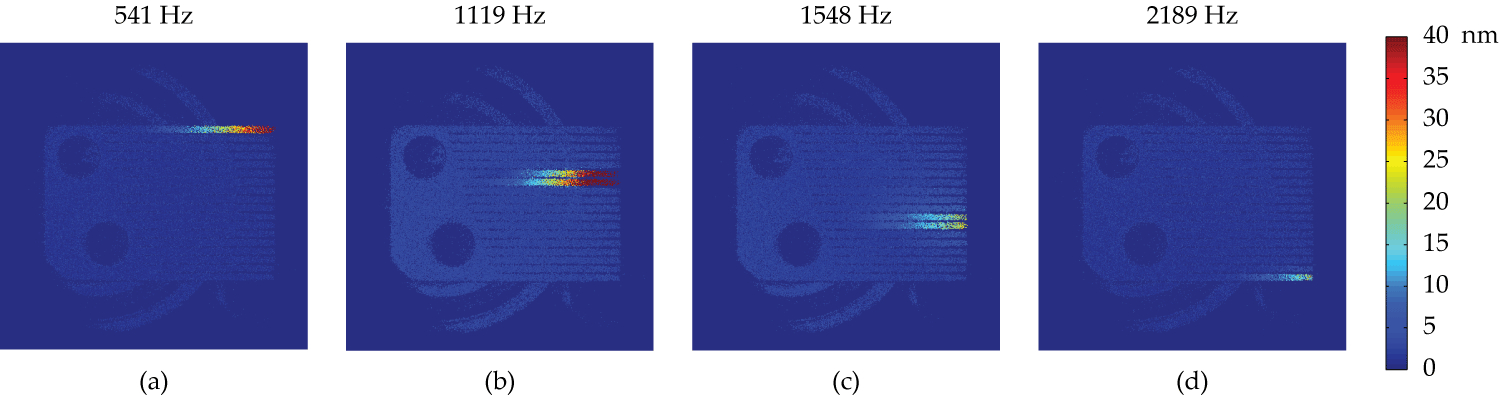
holographic vibrometry of the cantilevers of a musical box by frequency-division multiplexing

- 3-D vibrometers – A standard LDV measures the velocity of the target along the direction of the laser beam. To measure all three components of the target's velocity, a 3-D vibrometer measures a location with three independent beams, which strike the target from three different directions. This allows a determination of the complete in-plane and out-of-plane velocity of the target.
- Rotational vibrometers – A rotational LDV is used to measure rotational or angular velocity.
- Differential vibrometers – A differential LDV measures the out-of-plane velocity difference between two locations on the target.
- Multi-beam vibrometers – A multi-beam LDV measures the target velocity at several locations simultaneously.
- Self-mixing vibrometers – Simple LDV configuration with ultra-compact optical head. These are generally based on a laser diode with a built-in photodetector.
- Continuous scan laser Doppler vibrometry (CSLDV) – A modified LDV that sweeps the laser continuously across the surface of the test specimen to capture the motion of a surface at many points simultaneously

== See also ==
- Fibre-optic gyroscope
- Laser Doppler imaging
- Laser Doppler velocimetry
- Laser microphone
- Laser scanning vibrometry
- Laser surface velocimeter
- Laser turntable
- Optical heterodyne detection
