= Millimeter cloud radar =

Weather radar tuned to cloud detection

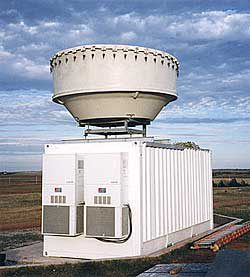
ARM Millimeter Cloud Radar (MMCR) operating at 35 GHz

Millimeter-wave cloud radars, also denominated cloud radars, are radar systems designed to monitor clouds with operating frequencies between 24 and 110 GHz (Table 1). Accordingly, their wavelengths range from 1 mm to 1.11 cm, about ten times shorter than those used in conventional S band radars such as NEXRAD.

== Purpose ==
=== Table 1: Millimetre cloud radar operating bands ===
Band name	Frequency range [GHz]	Wavelength range [mm]
Ka	24-40	7.5-11.1
W	75-100	2.7-4.0

The main purpose of these radars is the investigation of cloud properties and evolution. They typically operate at 35 GHz in the Ka band and at 94 GHz in the W band, where the atmospheric transmission is maximum. These frequencies correspond to wavelengths around 8 and 3 mm. Millimeter cloud radars have a high temporal and range resolution: temporal resolution is adjustable and typically ranges from 1 to 10 seconds, while the range resolution ranges from a few meters for cloud radars using frequency modulation of the transmitted signal (e.g. 4 m for the Frequency-Modulated Continuous-Wave (FMCW) 94 GHz cloud radar operating at UK Met Office), to several meters for magnetron based cloud radars (e.g. from 15 to 60 m for MIRA systems). The maximum detection range is between 14 and 20 km and the Doppler velocity resolution is of few cm/s. Most of the cloud radars are polarimetric, being able to measure the particles irregularity by means of the linear depolarization ratio (LDR). Usually they operate pointing to the zenith, but an increasing number of them have nowadays scanning units, that allow to retrieve additional information such as volume information when performing various Range Height Indicator (RHI) scans at different angles and at a relatively high speed, and vertical wind profiles, when performing plan position indicator (PPI) at few degrees from the zenith.

Regarding the different cloud radars operating wavelengths, it must be taken into account that longer wavelengths are less attenuated by drizzle and rain, while shorter wavelengths are more sensitive to smaller particles. Accordingly, radar signals are less attenuated in Ka-band than in W-band, while W-band radars are able to detect smaller particles. Even though, the cloud radar beams are much less attenuated by cloud or precipitation particles than the lidar beam.

Cloud radars are used nowadays to determine cloud boundaries (e.g. cloud bases and tops) and to estimate clouds microphysical properties, such as particle size and mass content, which aids in understanding how clouds reflect, absorb and transform radiant energy passing through the atmosphere. They are also intensively used to investigate fog. Furthermore, cloud radars are being used for entomology studies for more than 40 years, since Ka and W-band radars detect almost exclusively insect targets on warm cloudless days, and more recently are also used for the study of giant aerosols.

Even though most cloud radar systems are ground-based, they can also be airborne and space-based. Examples of airborne systems are cloud radars installed on HALO (High Altitude and Long Range Research Aircraft) and Wyoming KingAir Research Aircraft. An example of spaceborne Cloud Profiling Radar (CPR) is operating in the CloudSAT satellite since 2006. The first spaceborne CPR with Doppler capability will be launched in March 2023 aboard the Earth Clouds, Aerosols and Radiation Explorer (EarthCARE) mission.

== Measuring with a radar: from IQ to spectra ==
Pulsed Radar systems are considered active instruments because they transmit in the atmosphere an electromagnetic wave and receive the signal reflected back from the atmosphere. In such radars, the antenna sends out the electromagnetic wave, and then collects the returned signal. Radars are composed of different hardware parts, each of which contains different elements. The figure on page 9 in Clothiaux et al. 1996 is showing such units.

The electromagnetic wave sent in the atmosphere is an EM wave of the form shown in figure on page 10 of. Such wave is generated by an oscillator in the transmitter unit and then transferred through wave guides to the antenna, which radiates it in the atmosphere. The theory of propagating waves in rectangular shaped waveguides having a vertical axis of symmetry shows that by setting appropriate dimensions of the waveguide, the resulting electric field is propagating parallel to the interior space of the waveguide in the vertical direction, having a y sinusoidal in time component (transverse wave).

The expression of the electric field radiated at a distance $r$ far from the antenna is, adopting complex notation in spherical coordinate system $(r; \theta; \phi)$:

$E_i(r,\theta,\phi,t)=\frac{A_i(\theta,\phi)e^{i\phi t}}{r}e^{i(k_cr-\omega_c t)}U(t-2r/c)$	1

where $\omega_c$ is the carrier frequency of the wave, $t$ is the time, $c$ is the speed of light, $r$ is the distance from the antenna, $k_c$ is the wavenumber and $\lambda_c$ is the wavelength, while $A_i$ is the amplitude of the wave which depends on the power delivered to the antenna, on its characteristics and it is affected by the power losses in the waveguides. The function $U(t-2r/c)$ is a modulating function which is 1 when its argument is between 0 and $\tau$, and 0 elsewhere. Therefore, such electromagnetic (EM) field is oscillating sinusoidally in time within the pulse width $T_{pw}$ and is zero outside the pulse envelope, as shown in figure 3 on page 10 of. This EM wave is sent to the atmosphere: every pulse is scattered by a volume of air filled with hydrometeors and comes back to the radar. The antenna collects the returned signal, which is then filtered to remove the high carrier frequency, amplified and then downconverted and digitized.

The scattered electric field collected by the antenna is a composite of discrete echoes from all the scatterers contained in the volume and can be written as:

$E_{r}(t)=\sum_{m=0}^{N_s}A_{r,m}e^{i({2k_cr_m-(\omega_c-\omega_{d,m})t+\phi_{s,m}+\phi_{t}})}U(t-r/c)$	2

where $A_{r,m}$ is the amplitude of the electric field scattered by the mth scatterer, $r_m$ is the position of the mth scatterer, $\omega_c$ is the carrier frequency and $\omega_{d,m}t$ represents the shift in phase of the scattered wave in the direction of the radar due to the relative radial velocity of the target with respect to the radar, while $\phi_{s,m}$ and $\phi_{t}$ are respectively the phase shift upon scattering and the transmitter phase, which can be assumed constants ( $\phi_{s,m}$ can depend on time for meteorological targets like vibrating water drops and tumbling ice particles).

As already mentioned, a weather signal is a composite of echoes coming from a very large number of hydrometeors. Such echoes are received continuously at the radar antenna after a delay equal to the time taken by the wave to reach the target and come back to the radar. Since individual echoes are impossible to be resolved individually, we sample the signal coming from the atmosphere at given discrete time delays $\tau_s$.

Such $\tau_s$ defines the range of the scatterers that contribute mostly to the sample of the signal. The number of distinct resolution volumes in space from which the radar collects information is equal to the number of samples $N_g$ that are collected by the radar between any two radar pulses. The expression of the sampled received voltage is:

$V(\tau_s)=\sum_{m=0}^{N_g}A_{r,m}e^{i(2k_cr_m-(\omega_{d,m})t+\phi_{s,m})}$	3

For every range gate ( $\tau_s$) and for every pulse cycle ( $T_s$), the so-called I and Q voltages are derived taking the real and imaginary part of the complex voltage given in (3): Their expressions are:

$I(\tau_s, T_s)=Re[\sum_{i=0}^{N_g}A_{r,m}e^{i(2k_cr_m-(\omega_{d,m})t+\phi_{s,m})}]$	4

$Q(\tau_s, T_s)=Im[\sum_{i=0}^{N_g}A_{r,m}e^{i(2k_cr_m-(\omega_{d,m})t+\phi_{s,m})}]$	5

Therefore, after such sampling of the received signal, a time serie of I/Q signals is associated to every range gate.

As radar transmits coherent pulses with a certain pulse repetition frequency (PRF), the doppler processing technique is applied. A Power spectrum can be calculated from a sequence of $N_f I_n+iQ_n$ components in the following way. In every range gate the FFT algorithm is applied to the serie of $N_f$ IQ signals, where $N_f$ is the number of FFT points used in the FFT. The result of the FFT is a complex spectrum $S_{compl}(k)$ where $k$ is the Doppler frequency. The power spectra is then easily estimated by

$S(k)=S_{compl}*S_{compl}^*(k)$	6

Such spectra is the distribution of radial velocities of the targets in the volume analyzed weighted with the power of the signal.

== The Doppler spectra ==
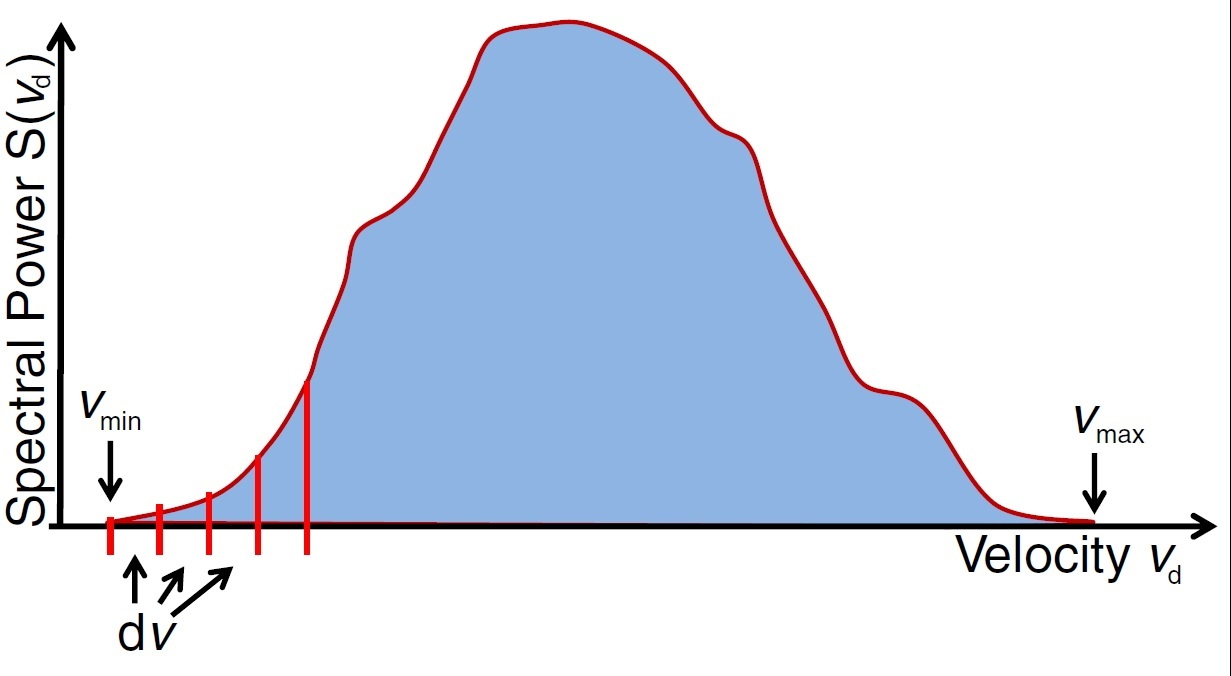
Sketch of a Doppler spectrum. The spectral power $S(v_{d})$ is represented as a function of the Doppler velocity $v_{d}$. The parameters $v_{min}$ and $v_{max}$ denote the minimum and the maximum velocities, at which $S(v_{d}) > 0$, and $dv$ is the velocity resolution.

Usually numerous targets are present in the sample volume of the radar. Each of the individual targets produces a frequency shift according to its radial velocity. Measuring the returned power in any interval of the frequency shift allows the detection of the Doppler spectrum. This is illustrated in the Figure on the right, where a sketch of the Doppler spectrum is shown. The frequency is already converted into velocity in the x axis.

From the Doppler spectrum the reflectivity $Z$ can be calculated using the expression:

$Z = \int\limits_{v_{min}}^{v_{max}} S(v_{d}) dv_{d}$	7

The integral of the spectral power $S(v_{d})$ is called the 0-moment of the Doppler spectrum, which equals the reflectivity $Z$. Further, the first moment (8) and the second moment (9) of the Doppler spectrum can be calculated:

$V = \frac{1}{Z}\int\limits_{v_{min}}^{v_{max}} v_{d} S(v_{d}) dv_{d}$	8

$W = \sqrt{\frac{1}{Z}\int\limits_{v_{min}}^{v_{max}} (v_{d} - V)^{2} S(v_{d}) dv_{d}}$	9

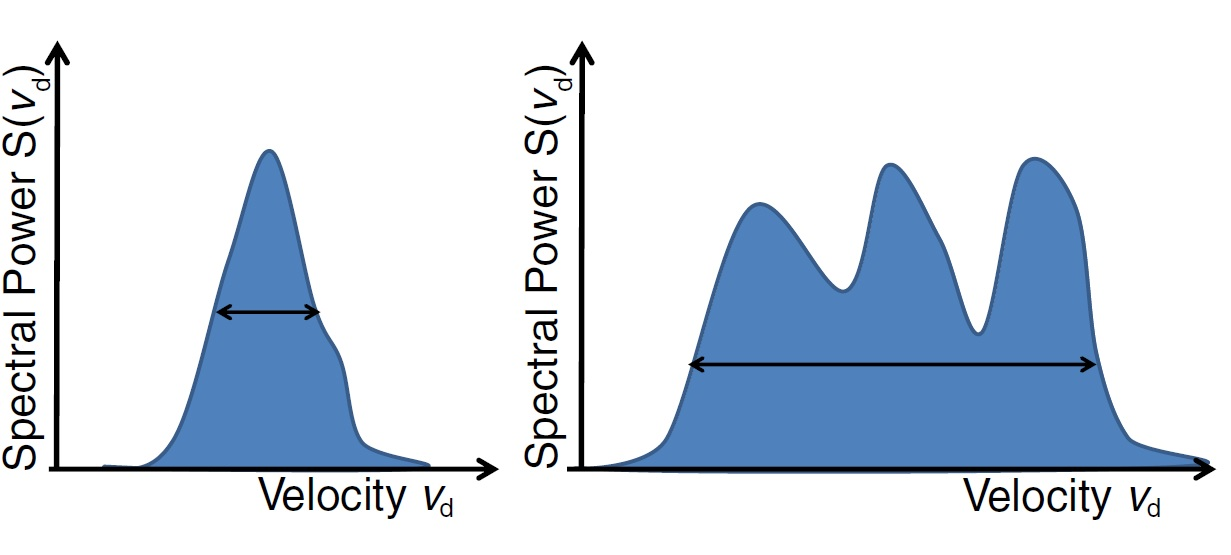
Sketch of the Doppler width. It shows the relation between the Doppler width $W$, depicted by the arrows, and the number of modes of the droplet size distribution.

The first moment of the Doppler spectrum is the mean Doppler velocity $V$. It corresponds to the mean radial velocity in the sampled volume.

The second moment is called the Doppler width $W$. It corresponds to the variance of the Doppler spectrum. The Doppler width basically is a measure of the width of the spectrum of the detected velocities. It can also be a measure of the number of modes the targets size distribution has. A mono-modal distribution gives a small spectral width. A distribution that has several modes yields a larger spectral width, as illustrated in Figure 5. The spectral width is also influenced by turbulent motion of the targets in the sample volume: the spectral width increases with increasing turbulence.

The expressions to calculate the Kurtosis and the Skewness are coming out of mathematical statistics several formulations are used. Some of them can be found in the quoted literature in Kurtosis section.

=== Doppler velocity ===
Mean Doppler velocity can be seen as the mean frequency of a power spectrum (Doppler velocity) of the backscattered power.

Given the mean Doppler velocity (mean frequency of the power spectrum) of the measured volume along the line of sight – the radial velocity. For vertical measurements, the Doppler velocities is the sum of terminal velocity of particles, caused by gravity force, and air motions within the measured volume. Terminal velocity contains the information about microphysical properties of cloud particles. In order to obtain the terminal velocity from the cloud-radar observations, the influence of air motions that shift the spectrum have to be removed from the Doppler spectra, improving in this way the microphysics representativity. An approach to correct this shift is given by Kollias et al., improving the accuracy of the relation between the corrected Doppler velocity and the particle fall velocities.

=== Doppler width ===
The Doppler width, or Doppler spectrum width, is the standard deviation of the spectrum. Accordingly, small values stand for narrow spectra, while higher spectrum width corresponds to a bigger spreading of the hydrometeors over the velocity domain (frequency domain). Reasons for a higher width could be bi- or multiple-modal spectra. This means that the measured volume contains more than one hydrometeor population, which leads to two or more modes in the Doppler spectrum because of the different terminal velocities. A rapid change in Doppler width in combination with the mean Doppler velocity can also be used to separate two hydrometeor population.

Since the air motion in the atmosphere affects the Doppler width, this parameter provides information about turbulence within the measured volume. Up- and downdrafts slow down the terminal fall velocities and can decrease or increase the Doppler width. If the measurements are not done pointing to the zenith, the horizontal wind component influences the width as well. The knowledge of the actual wind components in the atmosphere can be used to correct the Doppler spectrum, so that the retrieved microphysical parameters can be improved and the uncertainties decreased.

=== Skewness ===
The skewness parameter of the Doppler spectrum describes the asymmetry of the spectrum with respect to a symmetric Gaussian distribution.

$Sk=\frac{\frac{1}{Z}\int_{v_{min}}^{v_{max}} (v_{d}-V)^{3} |S(v_{d})|^{2}~\mathrm{d}v_{d}}{W^{3}}$	10

This parameter relates the location of the spectrum peak in respect to the mean spectrum value. Therefore, a positive skewness value indicates that the peak is located to the left with respect to the mean. A negative skewed spectrum has its peak on the right side with respect to the spectrum mean. A value around zero indicates a symmetric spectrum. In this way, the shape of a Doppler gives information on changes of cloud microphysics or of dynamical changes within the measured volume. The higher the elevation of the radar is, the higher are the dynamical influences on this parameter. Because wind shears lead to a broadening of the Doppler spectrum width, they can lead to rapid changes in skewness as well. To be able to relate the change in skewness of the Doppler spectrum, the Doppler width should be cross-checked as well.

If the radar measurements are done vertically, the skewness of the Doppler spectrum gives information about measured cloud microphysics. The horizontal wind within the measured volumes cause only a shift of the whole spectrum within the Doppler domain. This means that the spectrum is shifted along the Doppler velocity axis but it did not influence the broadening of the spectra. So the changes in skewness give information about:

- if the minority of the hydrometeors is falling faster or slower as the mean Doppler velocity
- if the Doppler spectrum is dominated by small hydrometeors (slower than the mean) or bigger particles (faster than the mean Doppler velocity)
- the shape of the size distribution of the measured hydrometeors
- changes over height or time can be related to a change in the cloud microphysics

=== Kurtosis ===
The kurtosis of the Doppler spectrum also relates to its curve. It describes the tails of the spectrum curve relative to Gaussian.

$K=\frac{\frac{1}{Z}\int_{v_{min}}^{v_{max}} (v_{d}-V)^{4} |S(v_{d})|^{2}~\mathrm{d}v_{d}}{W^{4}}$	11

Since the measure is dominated by the extremes, kurtosis can give information about the spectrum tail weight, helping to describe the spectrum better.

If a Doppler spectrum is exactly normally distributed, then its kurtosis equals 3.0. If in general the kurtosis is >3, then the spectrum is called leptokurtic, or leptokurtotic. It can be assumed that the Doppler spectrum is dominated by one single particle population that leads to a strong and narrow peak, which in some (but not all) cases is indicated by high kurtosis. If the spectrum has kurtosis <3 then it is called platykurtic, or platykurtotic. The shape of such a spectrum (in some cases) may have a lower, wider peak around the mean and thinner tails, but it can also be infinitely peaked, so kurtosis is not a good measure of "peakedness." Examples of such shapes can be found in the kurtosis wiki entry.

The Doppler radar kurtosis analysis started quite recently, so there are still few scientific publications dealing with this parameter. An example can be found in Kollias et al., where kurtosis is used to interpret Doppler spectra and to understand the microphysical changes that it represents.

== Polarimetric measurements in cloud radars ==
Polarimetric methods are considered to be a powerful tool in the remote sensing of the atmosphere, and particularly in radar observations of clouds and precipitation. Polarimetric techniques have been well developed for operational use in weather radar networks such as American NEXRAD and European OPERA, and, currently, are being implemented in ground based and airborne cloud radars. These techniques enable advanced clutter filtering, discrimination between meteorological and non-meteorological targets, and classification of atmospheric scatterers. Another potential of polarimetric measurements of cloud radars is the estimation of ice crystals habit that is one of the main problems in remote observations of mixed-phase clouds. The assumed shape of ice crystals is considered to be the main source of errors in size and number concentration retrievals based on vertical combined lidar and radar observations. Furthermore, in the existing numerical weather prediction models the assumed shape defines the depositional growth rate of ice particles and the area-mass-terminal velocity relations of ice crystals. Thus, ice habit can lead to significant uncertainties.

A number of different polarimetric configurations were evaluated in theoretical and experimental studies and are explained below.

Most of the existing pulse cloud radars operate in the LDR-mode. In this mode, a radar transmits a horizontally polarized radiation and receives horizontal and vertical components of the scattered radiation in co-polarized and cross-polarized channels, respectively. The ratio of the power in the cross-polarized channel over the power in the co-polarized channel, named as linear depolarization ratio, is the polarimetric variable obtained by cloud radars of this type. Often cloud radars have two receiving units, which allows simultaneous measurements of the orthogonal components of the received signal. Some cloud radars have only one receiving unit and measure the orthogonal components consequently, with pulse-to-pulse switching of the receiving channel. Many of operational cloud radars with LDR-mode are pointed vertically together with other remote sensing instruments in order to retrieve microphysical properties of cloud particles. LDR, measured by vertically pointed cloud radar, is used for the detection of the melting layer (also denominated as bright band) and clutter filtering. The application of LDR-mode for the shape classification in scanning cloud radars is limited by its high sensitivity to the orientation of scatterers.

Some cloud radars operate in the SLDR-mode, that is a modification of traditional LDR-mode. In this mode the antenna system of the radar is rotated by 45°, i.e. the transmitted signal has +45° or -45° polarization. In contrast to LDR-mode, SLDR-mode is less sensitive to the particles orientation and, therefore, it is used in cloud radars for the classification of ice crystals. Determination of ice crystals' habit by ground based cloud radars requires elevation scanning and is based on analysis of the angular changes of the polarimetric variables. Evaluation of SLDR with in-situ observations showed the possibility to discriminate between rounded graupel, dendrite crystals, and aggregated ice particles.

Polarization-agile cloud radars use pulse-to-pulse switching between horizontal and vertical polarization state of the transmitted wave. In addition to LDR, such systems are able to measure differential reflectivity (Z_{DR}) and correlation coefficient (ρ_{HV}). The combined analysis of LDR, Z_{DR}, and ρ_{HV} can be used not only for classification of ice particle habit but also for characterization of their orientations.

CDR-mode cloud radars transmit a circularly polarized wave and receive co-polarized and cross-polarized components. The output polarimetric variable is the so-called circular depolarization ratio (CDR), and it is calculated as the ratio of cross-polarized power over the co-polarized power. In comparison with LDR, CDR is not affected by particles aligned in polarization plane, e.g. insects or ice crystals in electrified atmospheric conditions.

== Measurement example ==
As the cloud radars sample the atmosphere, they measure the backscatter signal produced by different hydrometeor types (cloud droplets, drizzle, rain drops, ice particles, snow, etc.) and non-hydrometeorological targets. All these targets have different vertical velocities and shapes, and therefore the Doppler spectra and LDR can be used to distinguish between targets. In the figure below, an example of the MIRA-36 cloud radar measurements in Potenza is shown, where using the information given by the different parameters, an identification of targets can be done:

- Liquid water clouds produce a signature in the reflectivity but not in the LDR, since the liquid droplets are almost spherical.
- Ice clouds are characterized by relatively high LDR signals due to their irregular shapes.
- Insects produce high LDR values and are usually within the Convective Boundary Layer (CBL), where up- and downdrafts are observed continuously.
- The melting layer can be identified by an enhancement of the LDR, which is caused by irregular ice particles coated by liquid water during the phase transition.
- Rain is characterized by high reflectivity values, high falling velocities and a broadening of the spectra.
- Liquid layers within mixed-phase clouds can be detected by slightly higher peak width values, in accordance to the higher turbulence within.

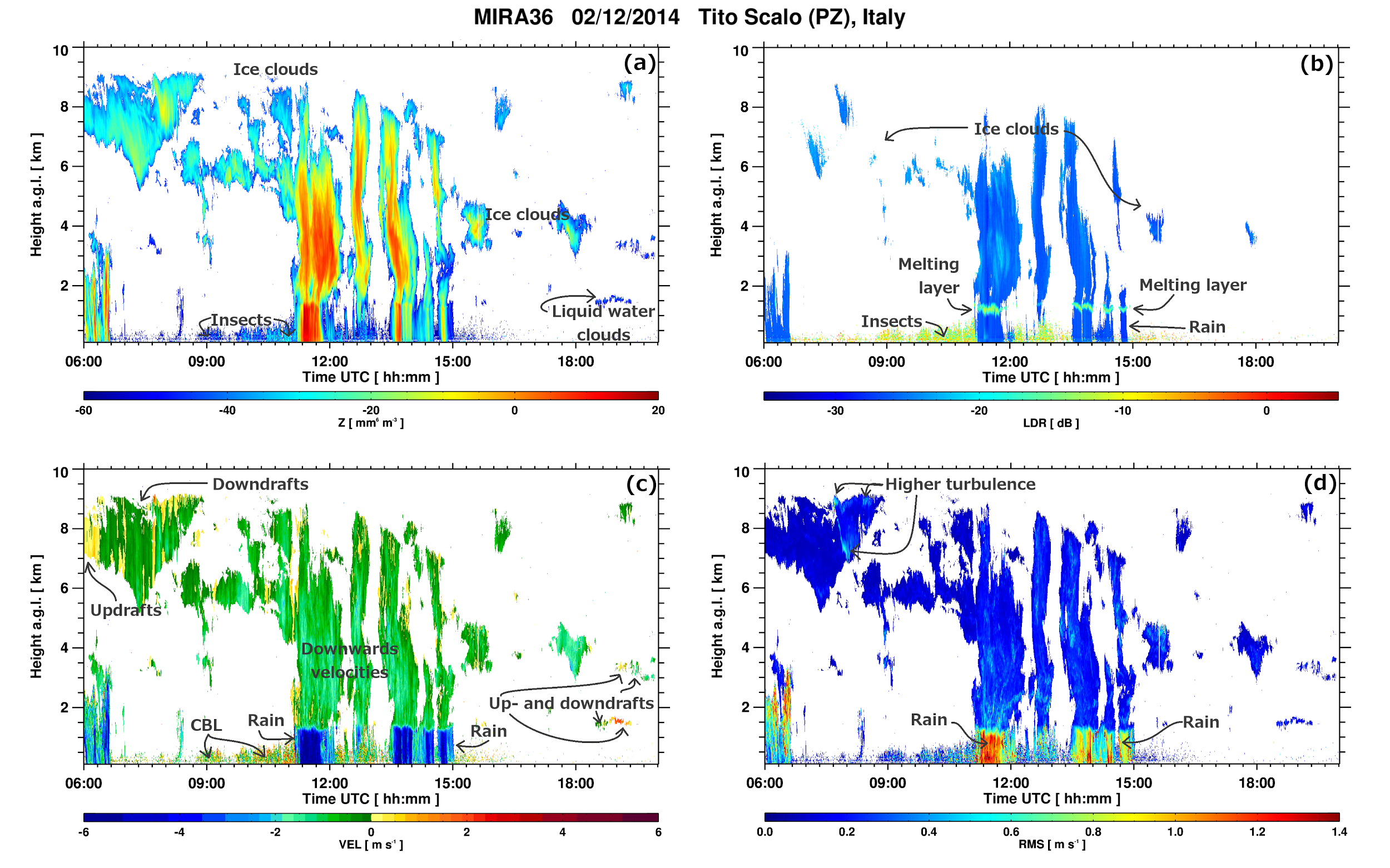
Measurements performed by a MIRA-36 system in Tito Scalo, Potenza (Italy) on 2 December 2014: (a) equivalent reflectivity, (b) Linear Depolarization Ratio, (c) Doppler velocity, where negative values indicate movement towards the radar, and (d) peak width.

== Cloud radar systems ==
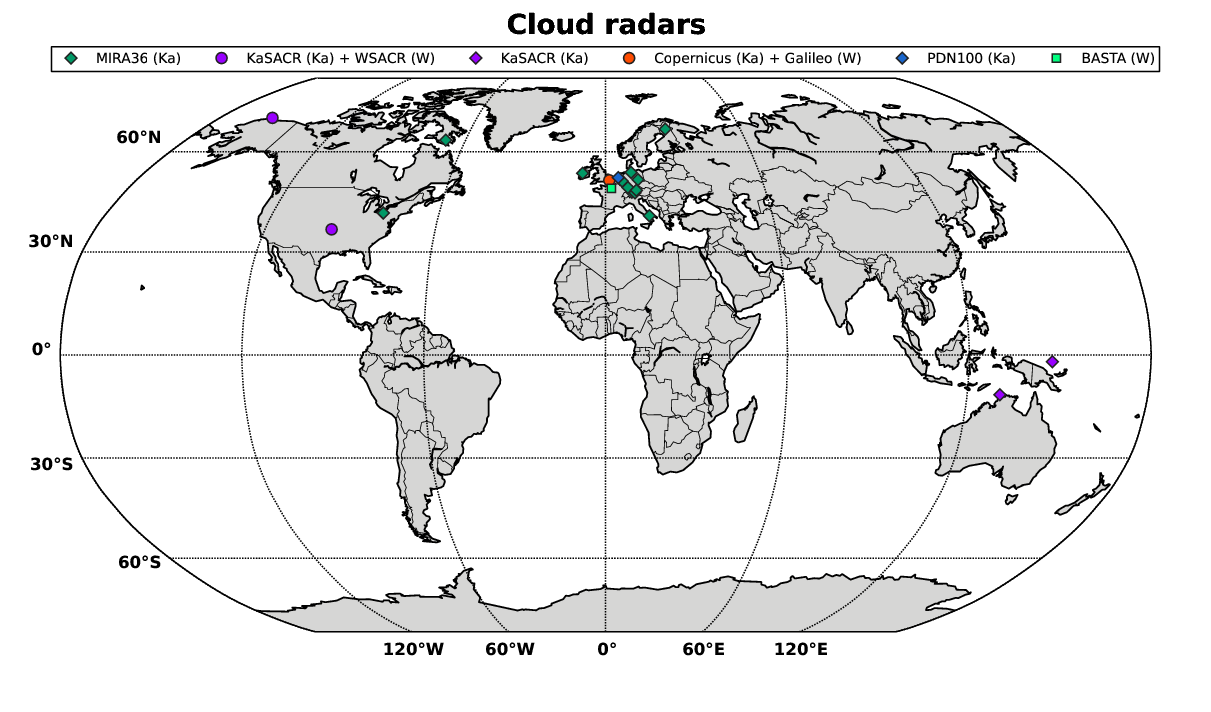
Cloud radar instruments involved in ACTRIS and NOAA projects

Pacific Northwest National Laboratory (PNNL) and Prosensing Inc. designed the Scanning ARM Cloud Radar (SACR) to monitor clouds overhead at various testing sites of the United States Department of Energy's atmospheric radiation measurement program. The radars operate continuously at these sites in Oklahoma, Alaska and the tropical western Pacific Ocean, and are designed to function for at least ten years with minimal staff oversight. The SACR s operate at a frequency of 35 and 94 GHz, being designated as KaSACR and WSACR respectively.

Since the late 2000s, a meteorological 35.5 GHz Ka-band commercial cloud radar (MIRA-36) designed by METEK GmbH in collaboration with the Institute for Radio Astronomy, Kharkov (Ukraine) is in the market. Nowadays, there are eleven systems monitoring the cloud properties continuously in different sites, most of them in Europe. Cloudnet, a network of stations for the continuous evaluation of cloud and aerosol profiles in operational NWP models, assimilates their data, as well as data acquired by other instruments in the various sites with this purpose.

Outside of these networks, some research sites are also operating cloud radars. For example, at the Chilbolton Observatory (UK), two mm-wavelength radars are operating continuously at 3.2 and 9 mm for the study of insects migrations, while a 35 GHz cloud radar is operating in Cabauw (the Netherlands).

=== Table 2: Cloud radar systems involved in ACTRIS and NOAA projects ===
Location	Band	Frequency [GHz]	Wavelength [mm]	Type	Location
ARM Mobile Facility 1	Ka	35	8.6	Ka-SACR	Mobile
ARM Mobile Facility 1	W	94	3.2	W-SACR	Mobile
ARM Mobile Facility 2	Ka	35	8.6	Ka-SACR	Mobile
Chilbolton, UK	Ka	35	9	Copernicus	51°8′40.53″N 1°26′19.60″W
Chilbolton, UK	W	94	3.2	Galileo	51°8′40.53″N 1°26′19.60″W
Cleveland, Ohio, USA	Ka	35.5	8.6	MIRA36	41°24′55.82″N 81°51′42.45″W
Galway, Ireland	Ka	35.5	8.6	MIRA36	53°16′42.79″N 9°3′37.86″W
Hamburg, Germany	Ka	35.5	8.6	MIRA36	53°33′56.40″N 9°58′30.27″E
Iqaluit, Canada	Ka	35.5	8.6	MIRA36	63°44′55″N 68°31′11″W
Juelich, Germany	Ka	35.5	8.6	MIRA36	50°54′19.02″N 6°24′17.38″E
Kalsruhe, Germany	Ka	35.5	8.6	MIRA36	49°0′42.91″N 8°25′1.13″E
Leipzig, Germany	Ka	35.5	8.6	MIRA36	51°21′8.19″N 12°26′2.90″E
Lindenberg, Germany	Ka	35.5	8.6	MIRA36	47°35′11.49″N 9°53′22.52″E
Munich, Germany	Ka	35.5	8.6	MIRA36	48°9′3.35″N 11°34′47.83″E
North Slope of Alaska, Barrow, Alaska, USA	Ka	35	8.6	Ka-SACR	71°19′23.73″N 156°36′56.70″W
North Slope of Alaska, Barrow, Alaska, USA	W	94	3.2	W-SACR	71°19′23.73″N 156°36′56.70″W
Palaiseau, France	W	95	3.16	BASTA	48°42′46.8″N 2°12′32.4″E
Potenza, Italy	Ka	35.5	8.6	MIRA36	40°36′15.93″N 15°43′12.03″E
Sodankylä, Finland	Ka	35.5	8.6	MIRA36	67°24′57.59″N 26°35′20.30″E
Southern Great Plains, Oklahoma, USA	Ka	35	8.6	Ka-SACR	36°36′18.0″N 97°29′6.0″W
Southern Great Plains, Oklahoma, USA	W	94	3.2	W-SACR	36°36′18.0″N 97°29′6.0″W
Tropical Western Pacific-Darwin, Australia	Ka	35	8.6	Ka-SACR	12°25′28.56″S 130°53′29.75″E
Tropical Western Pacific-Manus, Papua New Guinea	Ka	35	8.6	Ka-SACR	2°3′39.64″S 147°25′31.43″E
Zugspitze, Germany	Ka	35.5	8.6	MIRA36	47°25′16.00″N 10°59′7.00″E

== See also ==
- Extremely high frequency
