= Optical heterodyne detection =

Information method in electromagnetic radiation

Optical heterodyne detection is a method of extracting information encoded as modulation of the phase, frequency or both of electromagnetic radiation in the wavelength band of visible or infrared light. The light signal is compared with standard or reference light from a "local oscillator" (LO) that would have a fixed offset in frequency and phase from the signal if the latter carried null information. "Heterodyne" signifies more than one frequency, in contrast to the single frequency employed in homodyne detection.

The comparison of the two light signals is typically accomplished by combining them in a photodiode detector, which has a response that is linear in energy, and hence quadratic in amplitude of electromagnetic field. Typically, the two light frequencies are similar enough that their difference or beat frequency observed by the detector is in the radio or microwave band that can be conveniently processed by electronic means.

This technique became widely applicable to topographical and velocity-sensitive imaging with the invention in the 1990s of synthetic array heterodyne detection. The light reflected from a target scene is focused on a relatively inexpensive photodetector consisting of a single large physical pixel, while a different LO frequency is tightly focused on each virtual pixel of this detector (a different LO frequency signal focused on a different part of the detector), resulting in an electrical signal from the detector carrying a mixture of beat frequencies that can be electronically isolated and distributed spatially (as we know which part of the detector gives which beat frequency) to present an image of the scene.

== History ==
Optical heterodyne detection began to be studied at least as early as 1962, within two years of the construction of the first laser. However, laser illumination is not the only way to produce spatially coherent light. In 1995, Guerra published results in which he used a "form of optical heterodyning" to detect and image a grating with frequency many times smaller than the illuminating wavelength, and therefore smaller than the resolution, or passband, of the microscope, by beating it against a local oscillator in the form of a similar but transparent grating. A form of super-resolution microscopy, this work continues to spawn a family and generation of microscopes of particular use in the life sciences, known as "structured illumination microscopy", Polaroid Corp. patented Guerra's invention in 1997.

== Contrast to conventional radio frequency (RF) heterodyne detection ==
It is instructive to contrast the practical aspects of heterodyne detection in optical band to radio frequency (RF) band.

=== Energy versus electric field detection ===
Unlike RF band detection, optical frequencies oscillate too rapidly to directly measure and process the electric field electronically (e.g., 632 nm in wavelength for a visible HeNe laser that appears red, is 4.75×10^{14} Hz in frequency). Instead optical photons are (usually) detected by absorbing the photon's energy, thus only revealing the magnitude of an optical signal, not the electric field phase. Hence the primary purpose of heterodyne mixing is to down shift the signal from the optical band to an electronically tractable frequency range.

In RF band detection, typically, the electromagnetic field drives oscillatory motion of electrons in an antenna; the captured EMF is subsequently electronically mixed with a local oscillator (LO) by any convenient non-linear circuit element with a quadratic term (most commonly a rectifier). In optical detection, the desired non-linearity is inherent in the photon absorption process itself. Conventional light detectors—so called "Square-law detectors"—respond to the photon energy to free bound electrons, and since the energy flux scales as the square of the electric field, so does the rate at which electrons are freed. A frequency difference between an input signal and a LO signal to a detector appears in the detector output electrical current, only when both signals illuminate the detector at the same time, causing the square of their combined fields to have a cross term or "difference" frequency modulating the average rate at which free electrons are generated.

=== Wideband local oscillators for coherent detection ===
Another point of contrast is the expected bandwidth of the input signal and local oscillator signal to the detector. Typically, an RF local oscillator is a pure frequency; pragmatically, "purity" means that a local oscillator's frequency bandwidth is much much less than the difference frequency between the input and LO signals. With optical signals, even with a laser, it is not simple to produce a reference frequency sufficiently pure to have either an instantaneous bandwidth or long term temporal stability that is less than a typical megahertz or kilohertz scale difference frequency. For this reason, the same source is often used to produce the LO and the input signals so that their difference frequency can be kept constant even if the center frequency wanders.

As a result, the mathematics of squaring the sum of two pure tones, normally invoked to explain RF heterodyne detection, is an oversimplified model of optical heterodyne detection. Nevertheless, the intuitive pure-frequency heterodyne concept still holds perfectly for the wideband case provided that the signal and LO are mutually coherent. Crucially, one can obtain narrow-band interference from coherent broadband sources: this is the basis for white light interferometry and optical coherence tomography. Mutual coherence permits the rainbow in Newton's rings, and supernumerary rainbows.

Consequently, optical heterodyne detection is usually performed as interferometry where the LO and (input) signal share a common origin, rather than, as in radio, a transmitter sending to a remote receiver. The remote receiver geometry is uncommon because generating a local oscillator signal that is coherent with a signal of independent origin is technologically difficult at optical frequencies. However, lasers of sufficiently narrow linewidth to allow the signal and LO to originate from different lasers do exist.

=== Photon counting ===
After optical heterodyne became an established technique, consideration was given to the conceptual basis for operation at such low signal light levels that "only a few, or even fractions of, photons enter the receiver in a characteristic time interval". It was concluded that even when photons of different energies (so different frequencies as energy per photon is $E = hf$ where $h$ is the Planck constant and $f$ is the wave frequency) are absorbed at a countable rate by a detector at different (random) times, the detector can still produce a difference frequency. Hence light seems to have wave-like properties not only as it propagates through space, but also when it interacts with matter. Progress with photon counting was such that by 2008 it was proposed that, even with larger signal strengths available, it could be advantageous to employ local oscillator power low enough to allow detection of the beat signal by photon counting. This was understood to have a main advantage of imaging with available and rapidly developing large-format multi-pixel counting photodetectors.

Photon counting was applied with frequency-modulated continuous wave (FMCW) lasers. Numerical algorithms were developed to optimize the statistical performance of the analysis of the data from photon counting.

== Key benefits ==
=== Gain in the detection ===
The strength of the difference frequency signal can be larger than the strength of the original signal. The strength of the difference frequency is proportional to the product of the amplitudes of the LO and original signal electric fields. Thus the larger the LO amplitude, the stronger the difference frequency strength. Hence there is gain in the photon conversion process. The Poynting vector $S$ of the sum of the LO and signal is proportional to the square of the sum:

$$S \propto \left[ E_\mathrm{sig}\cos(\omega_\mathrm{sig}t+\varphi_\mathrm{sig}) + E_\mathrm{LO}\cos(\omega_\mathrm{LO}t+\varphi_\mathrm{LO}) \right]^2 = E_\mathrm{sig}^2\cos^2(\omega_\mathrm{sig}t+\varphi_\mathrm{sig}) + E_\mathrm{LO}^2\cos^2(\omega_\mathrm{LO}t+\varphi_\mathrm{LO}) + 2E_\mathrm{sig}E_\mathrm{LO}\cos(\omega_\mathrm{sig}t+\varphi_\mathrm{sig})\cos(\omega_\mathrm{LO}t+\varphi_\mathrm{LO}).$$

A photodetector, like a photodiode, is much slower than optical frequency (4.75×10^{14} Hz at 632 nm in wavelength as a red color), so the detector integrates the Poynting vector over a time window much longer than an optical period (2.1×10^{−15} second for 632 nm in wavelength). In this sense, we can only consider the average of the Poynting vector over the integration window. By using the product-to-sum trigonometric identity and assuming that the detector is much faster than the difference frequency, the detector output is proportional to the following. (The sum of integrations of terms with $\cos$ at frequencies over a time window much longer than the periods of the frequencies statistically gives zero or a noise in values.)

$$S_\mathrm{avg} = \frac{1}{2}E_\mathrm{sig}^2+\frac{1}{2}E_\mathrm{LO}^2+E_\mathrm{LO}E_\mathrm{sig}\cos((\omega_\mathrm{sig} - \omega_\mathrm{LO})t + \Delta\varphi)$$

where $\Delta\varphi = \varphi_\mathrm{sig} - \varphi_\mathrm{LO}$. The first two terms are proportional to the average (DC) energy flux absorbed (or, equivalently, the average current in the case of photon counting). The third term is the difference frequency. In many applications the signal is weaker than the LO, thus it can be seen that gain occurs because the energy flux in the difference frequency $E_\mathrm{LO}E_\mathrm{sig}$ is greater than the DC energy flux of the signal $\frac{1}{2}E_\mathrm{sig}^2$.

==== Doppler effect ====
Suppose that a signal light in form of $E_\mathrm{sig} \cos \left ( \omega_\mathrm{sig} t - k_\mathrm{sig} \int n \left( x \right) x + \varphi_\mathrm{sig} \right )$, where $k_\mathrm{sig}$ is the wavenumber in vacuum, is toward a moving target mirror which position is $x_m(t)$. The mirror receives the light at time $t_m$ as

$$E_m \left( t_m \right) = E_\mathrm{sig} \cos \left (\omega_\mathrm{sig} t_m -k_\mathrm{sig} n_{md} x_m(t_m) - k_{\mathrm{sig}} \sum_{i} \int_{l_i} \left[ n_i \left( x \right) - n_{md} \right]dx + \sum_j \Delta \varphi_{j,refl} + \varphi_\mathrm{sig} \right)$$

where $n_{md}$ is the refractive index of the main wave propagation medium, $n_i \left( x \right)$ is a generally inhomogeneous refractive index of a transmissive optical element i with its length $l_i$, and $\Delta \varphi_{j,refl}$ is a phase shift by a reflective optical element j (Mirror reflection phase shift).

The target mirror immediately (ignoring the time dilation in the special relativity) reflects the light, so the reflected light is

$$E_{\mathrm{refl},m}\left ( t_m \right ) = E_\mathrm{sig} \cos \left ( \omega_\mathrm{sig} t_m - k_\mathrm{sig} n_{md} x_m +\varphi_\mathrm{sig}' \right )$$

where $(t_m)$ in $x_m(t_m)$ is dropped for simplicity, and $\varphi_\mathrm{sig}' = - k_{\mathrm{sig}} \sum_{i} \int_{l_i} \left[ n_i \left( x \right) - n_{md} \right]dx + \sum_j \Delta \varphi_{j,refl} + \varphi_\mathrm{sig}$ with now that the second summation (with the index j) includes a phase shift from the target mirror reflection.

The angular frequency of the reflected light is given by the time derivative of its phase;

$$\omega_{\mathrm{refl},m} \left( t_m \right ) = \frac{d}{d t_m} \left[ \omega_\mathrm{sig} t_m - k_\mathrm{sig} n_{md} x_m + \varphi_\mathrm{sig}' \right] = \omega_\mathrm{sig} - k_\mathrm{sig} n_{md} v_m = \omega_\mathrm{sig} \left[ 1 - \frac{v_m}{c / n_{md}} \right]$$

where $v_m$ is the mirror velocity at $t_m$. This is the Doppler-shifted frequency by the mirror in moving w.r.t the light source.

The reflected light is now toward a detector fixed at the location $x_d$. The detector receives this light at time $t = t_m + \frac{x_m - x_d}{c / n_{md,shift}} + \Delta t_{delay}$ where $\Delta t_{delay} = \sum_{p} \frac{\int_{l_p} \left[ n_{p,shift} \left( x \right) - n_{md,shift} \right]dx}{c}$ is an additional delay by the frequency-shifted light travelling through each transmissive optical element p till the detector. By assuming constant refractive indices and reflection phase changes over a laser frequency range made by the Doppler shift is assumed., the detected light is

$$\begin{align} E_\mathrm{det} \left( t \right) &= E_\mathrm{sig} \cos \left( \omega_\mathrm{sig} \left[ t - \frac{x_m - x_d}{c / n_{md}} - \Delta t_{delay} \right] - k_\mathrm{sig} n_{md} x_m + \varphi_\mathrm{sig}' \right)
\\ &= E_\mathrm{sig} \cos \left( \omega_\mathrm{sig} t - k_\mathrm{sig} n_{md} \left[ x_m - x_d \right] - k_\mathrm{sig} n_{md} x_m +\varphi_\mathrm{sig}'' \right)
\\ &= E_\mathrm{sig} \cos \left ( \omega_\mathrm{sig} t - 2k_\mathrm{sig} n_{md} x_m + k_\mathrm{sig} n_{md} x_d + \varphi_\mathrm{sig}'' \right ) \end{align}$$

where $\varphi_\mathrm{sig}'' = \varphi_\mathrm{sig}' - \omega_\mathrm{sig} \Delta t_{delay} = - k_{\mathrm{sig}} \sum_{i} \int_{l_i} \left[ n_i \left( x \right) - n_{md} \right]dx + \sum_j \Delta \varphi_{j,refl} + \varphi_\mathrm{sig} - \omega_{\mathrm{sig}}\sum_{p} \frac{\int_{l_p} \left[ n_p \left( x \right) - n_{md} \right]dx}{c} + \sum_q \Delta \varphi_{q,refl}$in which $\sum_q \Delta \varphi_{q,refl}$ counts for the phase changes by reflective optics in the way from the target mirror to the detector. The angular frequency of the detected signal light is given by the time derivative of its phase;

$$\omega_\mathrm{det} \left ( t \right ) = \frac{d}{dt} \left[ \omega_\mathrm{sig} t - 2k_\mathrm{sig} n_{md} x_m + k_\mathrm{sig} n_{md} x_d + \varphi_\mathrm{sig}'' \right]
= \omega_\mathrm{sig} - 2k_\mathrm{sig} n_{md} v_m
= \omega_\mathrm{sig} \left[ 1 - 2 \frac{v_m}{c / n_{md}} \right]$$

because $\frac{d x_m}{dt} = \frac{d x_m}{d t_m} \frac{d t_m}{dt} = v_m$ ($\frac{d t_m}{dt} = 1$ by ignoring the time dilation). (Note: For a constant target mirror velocity $x_m \left ( t \right ) = v_m t + x_{m0}$, the detected light can be expressed as $E_\mathrm{det}\left ( t \right ) = E_\mathrm{sig} \cos \left ( \omega_\mathrm{sig} \left[ t - 2 \frac{v_m}{c / n_{md}} t_m \right] + k_\mathrm{sig} n_{md} x_d - 2 k_\mathrm{sig} n_{md} x_{m0} + \varphi_\mathrm{sig}'' \right )$ where $\left( t_m \right)$ in $v_m \left( t_m \right)$ is dropped for simplicity. For the detector close enough to the mirror such that $x_d \approx x_m$ and $t \approx t_m$, it becomes $E_\mathrm{det}\left ( t \right ) = E_\mathrm{sig} \cos \left ( \omega_\mathrm{sig} \left[ 1 - 2 \frac{v_m}{c / n_{md}} \right] t - k_\mathrm{sig} n_{md} x_m + \varphi_\mathrm{sig}'' \right )$, explicitly showing the doppler-shifted frequency.) Note that $x_m$, $v_m$, and $t_m$ are retarded quantities (retarded position, velocity, and time) for the light reaching the detector $\left ( x, t \right)$.

Then, with a LO light (that travels through fixed optical elements) at the detector at the time $t$, $E_\mathrm{LO} \cos \left ( \omega_\mathrm{LO} t + \varphi_\mathrm{LO,det} \right )$, the heterodyne detection signal is proportional to

$$S_\mathrm{avg,hetero}\left ( t \right ) = E_\mathrm{LO}E_\mathrm{sig}\cos(\left[ \omega_\mathrm{sig} - \omega_\mathrm{LO} \right]t + \Delta\varphi)$$

where $\Delta \varphi = - 2k_\mathrm{sig} n_{md} x_m + \left[k_\mathrm{sig} n_{md} x_d + \varphi_\mathrm{sig}'' - \varphi_\mathrm{LO,det} \right] = - 2k_\mathrm{sig} n_{md} x_m + \varphi$ where $\varphi = \left[ \ldots \right]$ is a constant. The time derivate of the phase of the heterodyne signal is $\omega_\mathrm{sig} \left[ 1 - 2 \frac{v_m}{c / n_{md}} \right] - \omega_\mathrm{LO}$, which turns to measure the mirror velocity $v_m$ (at the retarded time $t_m$) if the signal and LO frequencies are known, and the integration of the velocity gives the mirror displacement w.r.t a measurement starting time. Note again that the measured mirror velocity (and the mirror displacement) are retarded quantities, at $t_m = t - \left[ \frac{x_m - x_d}{c / n_{md}} + \Delta t_\mathrm{delay} \right]$.

So far, one round travel (positive integer n = 1) to the moving target mirror by the signal light is considered, giving the Doppler-shifted angular frequency at the detector $\omega_\mathrm{det} \left ( t \right ) = \omega_\mathrm{sig} \left[ 1 - 2 \frac{v_m}{c / n_{md}} \right]$. For two round travels (n = 2), the Doppler-shifted light will again go to the target mirror, reflected again toward the detector, so undergo another doppler-shift. For n round travels (e.g., n = 2 for 2-paths interferometer) and that the mirror velocity is about the same during these travels, (Note: It is a practical assumption because time between adjacent round travels to the target mirror is typically much shorter than the mirror velocity change time scale, e.g., ~ 10 ns taken for light to travel a distance of 3 m in vacuum or air.) the detector receives the signal with the frequency of $\omega_\mathrm{det} \left ( t \right ) = \omega_\mathrm{sig} \left[ 1 - 2 \frac{v_m}{c / n_{md}} \right]^n$.

Depending on a purpose of the measurement, an additional method to measure the absolute position of the mirror (that may be with less accuracy) at the heterodyne detection measurement start time may be required to acquire absolute mirror position measurement in a given coordinates system (measured position = initial absolute position + heterodyne-measured relative position change).

=== Preservation of optical phase ===
The electronically measured signal beam's energy flux, $\frac{1}{2} E_\mathrm{sig}^2$, is DC and thus erases the phase associated with its optical frequency; Heterodyne detection allows this phase to be detected. If the optical phase of the signal beam shifts by an angle phi, then the phase of the electronic difference frequency shifts by exactly the same angle phi. More properly, to discuss an optical phase shift one needs to have a common time base reference. Typically the signal beam is derived from the same laser as the LO but shifted by some modulator in frequency. In other cases, the frequency shift may arise from reflection from a moving object. As long as the modulation source maintains a constant offset phase between the LO and signal source, any added optical phase shifts over time arising from external modification of the return signal are added to the phase of the difference frequency and thus are measurable.

=== Mapping optical frequencies to electronic frequencies allows sensitive measurements ===
As noted above, the difference frequency linewidth can be much smaller than the optical linewidth of the signal and LO signal, provided the two are mutually coherent. Thus small shifts in optical signal center-frequency can be measured: For example, Doppler lidar systems can discriminate wind velocities with a resolution better than 1 meter per second, which is less than a part in a billion Doppler shift in the optical frequency. Likewise small coherent phase shifts can be measured even for nominally incoherent broadband light, allowing optical coherence tomography to image micrometer-sized features. Because of this, an electronic filter can define an effective optical frequency bandpass that is narrower than any realizable wavelength filter operating on the light itself, and thereby enable background light rejection and hence the detection of weak signals.

=== Noise reduction to shot noise limit ===
As with any small signal amplification, it is most desirable to get gain as close as possible to the initial point of the signal interception: moving the gain ahead of any signal processing reduces the additive contributions of effects like resistor Johnson–Nyquist noise, or electrical noises in active circuits. In optical heterodyne detection, the mixing-gain happens directly in the physics of the initial photon absorption event, making this ideal. Additionally, to a first approximation, absorption is perfectly quadratic, in contrast to RF detection by a diode non-linearity.

One of the virtues of heterodyne detection is that the difference frequency is generally far away spectrally from the potential noises radiated during the process of generating either the signal or the LO signal, thus the spectral region near the difference frequency may be relatively quiet. Hence, narrow electronic filtering near the difference frequency is highly effective at removing the remaining, generally broadband, noise sources.

The primary remaining source of noise is photon shot noise from the nominally constant DC level, which is typically dominated by the Local Oscillator (LO). Since the shot noise scales as the amplitude of the LO electric field level, and the heterodyne gain also scales the same way, the ratio of the shot noise to the mixed signal is constant no matter how large the LO.

Thus in practice one increases the LO level, until the gain on the signal raises it above all other additive noise sources, leaving only the shot noise. In this limit, the signal to noise ratio is affected by the shot noise of the signal only (i.e. there is no noise contribution from the powerful LO because it divided out of the ratio). At that point there is no change in the signal to noise as the gain is raised further. (Of course, this is a highly idealized description; practical limits on the LO intensity matter in real detectors and an impure LO might carry some noise at the difference frequency)

== Key problems and their solutions ==
=== Array detection and imaging ===
Array detection of light, i.e. detecting light in a large number of independent detector pixels, is common in digital camera image sensors. However, it tends to be quite difficult in heterodyne detection, since the signal of interest is oscillating (also called AC by analogy to circuits), often at millions of cycles per second or more. At the typical frame rates for image sensors, which are much slower, each pixel would integrate the total light received over many oscillation cycles, and this time-integration would destroy the signal of interest. Thus a heterodyne array must usually have parallel direct connections from every sensor pixel to separate electrical amplifiers, filters, and processing systems. This makes large, general purpose, heterodyne imaging systems prohibitively expensive. For example, simply attaching 1 million leads to a megapixel coherent array is a daunting challenge.

To solve this problem, synthetic array heterodyne detection (SAHD) was developed. In SAHD, large imaging arrays can be multiplexed into virtual pixels on a single element detector with single readout lead, single electrical filter, and single recording system. The time domain conjugate of this approach is Fourier transform heterodyne detection, which also has the multiplex advantage and also allows a single element detector to act like an imaging array. SAHD has been implemented as Rainbow heterodyne detection in which instead of a single frequency LO, many narrowly spaced frequencies are spread out across the detector element surface like a rainbow. The physical position where each photon arrived is encoded in the resulting difference frequency itself, making a virtual 1D array on a single element detector. If the frequency comb is evenly spaced then, conveniently, the Fourier transform of the output waveform is the image itself. Arrays in 2D can be created as well, and since the arrays are virtual, the number of pixels, their size, and their individual gains can be adapted dynamically. The multiplex disadvantage is that the shot noise from all the pixels combine since they are not physically separated.

=== Speckle and diversity reception ===
As discussed, the LO and signal must be temporally coherent. They also need to be spatially coherent across the face of the detector or they will destructively interfere. In many usage scenarios the signal is reflected from optically rough surfaces or passes through optically turbulent media leading to wavefronts that are spatially incoherent. In laser scattering this is known as speckle.

In RF detection the antenna is rarely larger than the wavelength so all excited electrons move coherently within the antenna, whereas in optics the detector is usually much larger than the wavelength and thus can intercept a distorted phase front, resulting in destructive interference by out-of-phase photo-generated electrons within the detector.

While destructive interference dramatically reduces the signal level, the summed amplitude of a spatially incoherent mixture does not approach zero but rather the mean amplitude of a single speckle. However, since the standard deviation of the coherent sum of the speckles is exactly equal to the mean speckle intensity, optical heterodyne detection of scrambled phase fronts can never measure the absolute light level with an error bar less than the size of the signal itself. This upper bound signal-to-noise ratio of unity is only for absolute magnitude measurement: it can have signal-to-noise ratio better than unity for phase, frequency or time-varying relative-amplitude measurements in a stationary speckle field.

In RF detection, "diversity reception" is often used to mitigate low signals when the primary antenna is inadvertently located at an interference null point: by having more than one antenna one can adaptively switch to whichever antenna has the strongest signal or even incoherently add all of the antenna signals. Simply adding the antennae coherently can produce destructive interference just as happens in the optical realm.

The analogous diversity reception for optical heterodyne has been demonstrated with arrays of photon-counting detectors. For incoherent addition of the multiple element detectors in a random speckle field, the ratio of the mean to the standard deviation will scale as the square root of the number of independently measured speckles. This improved signal-to-noise ratio makes absolute amplitude measurements feasible in heterodyne detection.

However, as noted above, scaling physical arrays to large element counts is challenging for heterodyne detection due to the oscillating or even multi-frequency nature of the output signal. Instead, a single-element optical detector can also act like diversity receiver via synthetic array heterodyne detection or Fourier transform heterodyne detection. With a virtual array one can then either adaptively select just one of the LO frequencies, track a slowly moving bright speckle, or add them all in post-processing by the electronics.

=== Coherent temporal summation ===
One can incoherently add the magnitudes of a time series of N independent pulses to obtain a √N improvement in the signal to noise on the amplitude, but at the expense of losing the phase information. Instead coherent addition (adding the complex magnitude and phase) of multiple pulse waveforms would improve the signal to noise by a factor of N, not its square root, and preserve the phase information. The practical limitation is adjacent pulses from typical lasers have a minute frequency drift that translates to a large random phase shift in any long distance return signal, and thus just like the case for spatially scrambled-phase pixels, destructively interfere when added coherently. However, coherent addition of multiple pulses is possible with advanced laser systems that narrow the frequency drift far below the difference frequency (intermediate frequency). This technique has been demonstrated in multi-pulse coherent Doppler LIDAR.

== See also ==
- Fibre-optic gyroscope
- Heterodyne
- Homodyne
- Interferometry
- Laser Doppler vibrometer
- Laser microphone
- Laser turntable
- Optical coherence tomography
- Rainbow heterodyne detection
- Superheterodyne
