= Ceilometer =

Ground-based lidar for cloud height measurement

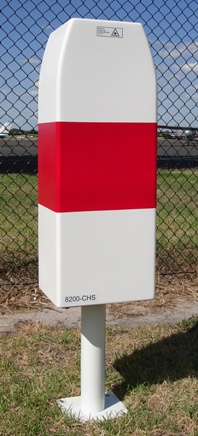
Laser ceilometer

A ceilometer is a device that uses a laser or other light source to determine the height of a cloud ceiling or cloud base. Ceilometers can also be used to measure the aerosol concentration within the atmosphere. A ceilometer that uses laser light is a type of atmospheric lidar (light detection and ranging) instrument.

== Optical drum ceilometer ==
An optical drum ceilometer uses triangulation to determine the height of a spot of light projected onto the base of the cloud. It consists essentially of a rotating projector, a detector, and a recorder. The projector emits an intense beam of light above into the sky at an angle that varies with the rotation. The detector, which is located at a fixed distance from the projector, uses a photodetector pointing vertically. When it detects the projected light return from the cloud base, the instrument notes the angle and the calculation gives the height of clouds.

== Laser ceilometer ==
A laser ceilometer consists of a vertically pointing laser and a receiver in the same location. A laser pulse with a duration on the order of nanoseconds is sent through the atmosphere. As the beam travels through the atmosphere, tiny fractions of the light are scattered by aerosols. Generally, the size of the particles in question are similar in size to the wavelength of the laser. This situation leads to Mie scattering. A small component of this scattered light is directed back to the lidar receiver. The timing of the received signal can be transformed into a spatial range, z, by using the speed of light. That is,

$$\text{distance} = \frac {c \delta t}{2}$$

where c is the light speed in the air.

In this way, each pulse of laser light results in a vertical profile of aerosol concentration within the atmosphere. Generally, many individual profiles will be averaged together in order to increase the signal-to-noise ratio and average profiles are reported on a time scale of seconds. The presence of clouds or water droplets leads to a very strong return signal compared to background levels, which allows for cloud heights to be easily identified.

Since the instrument will note any returns, it is possible to locate any faint layer where it occurs, additionally to the cloud's base, by looking at the whole pattern of returned energy. Furthermore, the rate at which diffusion happens can be noted by the diminishing part returned to the ceilometer in clear air, giving the coefficient of extinction of the light signal. Using these data could give the vertical visibility and the possible concentration of air pollutants. This has been developed in research and could be applied for operational purpose.

In New Zealand, MetService operates a network of laser ceilometers for cloud base measurements at commercial airports. These sensors are also used to map volcanic ash clouds to allow commercial air traffic to avoid damage caused by ash. The movement of volcanic ash has also been tracked from areas such as Iceland.

Examination of the behavior of ceilometers under various cloud-cover conditions has led to the improvement of algorithms to avoid false readings. Accuracy of measurement can be impacted by the limited vertical range and areal extent of a ceilometer's area of observation.

A common use of ceilometers is to monitor the cloud ceiling for airports. A study group from Montreal, Canada in 2013 recommended that ceilometers should be installed "close to the landing threshold" for aerodromes with precision approach runways, but also considered their location "at the middle marker or at an equivalent distance" to be acceptable.

== Hazards ==
Ceilometers that use visible light can sometimes be fatal to birds, as the animals become disoriented by the light beams and suffer exhaustion and collisions with other birds and structures. In the worst recorded ceilometer non-laser light beam incident, approximately 50,000 birds from 53 different species died at Warner Robins Air Force Base in the United States during one night in 1954.

Laser ceilometers use invisible lasers to observe the cloud base. Using optical instruments such as binoculars near ceilometers is not recommended, because lenses in instruments could concentrate the beam and damage one's eyes.

== See also ==
- Automated airport weather station
