= Laser microphone =

Acoustic surveillance device

A laser microphone is a surveillance device that uses a laser beam to detect sound vibrations in a distant object. It can be used to eavesdrop with minimal chance of exposure.

The object is typically inside a room where a conversation is taking place and can be anything that can vibrate (for example, a picture on a wall) in response to the pressure waves created by noises present in the room. The object preferably should have a smooth surface for the beam to be reflected accurately. The laser beam is directed into the room through a window, reflects off the object, and returns to a receiver that converts the beam to an audio signal. The beam may also be bounced off the window itself. The minute differences in the distance traveled by the light as it reflects from the vibrating object are detected interferometrically. The interferometer converts the variations to intensity variations, and electronics are used to convert these variations to signals that can be converted back to sound.

== History ==
The technique of using a light beam to remotely record sound probably originated with Léon Theremin in the Soviet Union at or before 1947, when he developed and used the Buran eavesdropping system. This worked by using a low power infrared beam (not a laser) from a distance to detect the sound vibrations in the glass windows. Lavrentiy Beria had used this Buran system to spy on the U.S., British, and French embassies in Moscow.

On 25 August 2009, U.S. patent 7,580,533 was issued for a device that uses a laser beam and smoke or vapor to detect sound vibrations in free air ("Particulate Flow Detection Microphone based on a laser-photocell pair with a moving stream of smoke or vapor in the laser beam's path"). Sound pressure waves cause disturbances in the smoke that in turn cause variations in the amount of laser light reaching the photo detector. A prototype of the device was demonstrated at the 127th Audio Engineering Society convention in New York City from 9 through 12 October 2009.

== See also ==
- Photophone
- Passive radar
- Laser Doppler vibrometer
- The Thing (listening device)
- List of laser articles
- Laser turntable
- Optical heterodyne detection
