= Laser scanning vibrometry =

Device for measurement and imaging of vibration

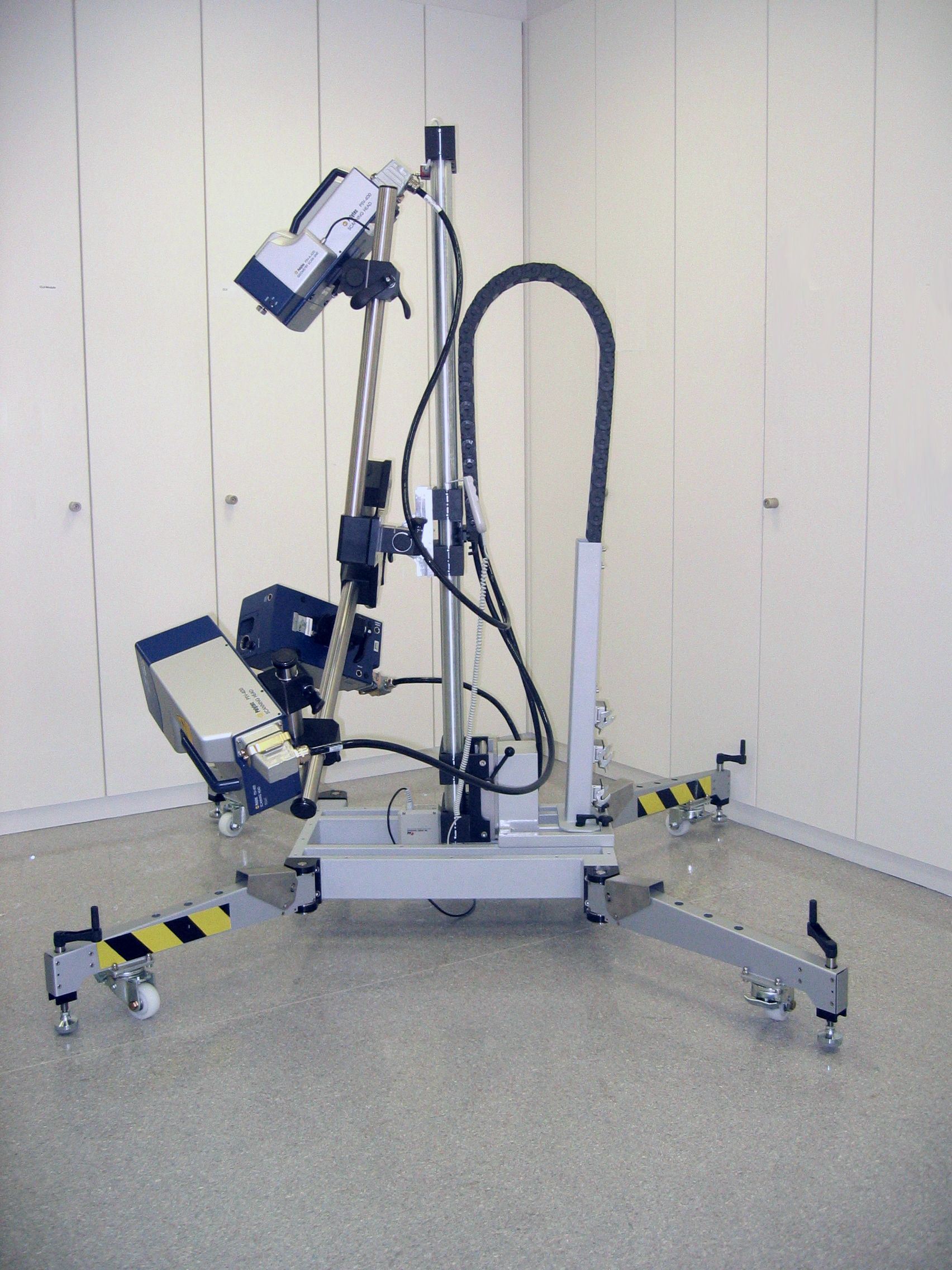
3D Scanning Vibrometer

Vibrometric recording of a Callosobruchus maculatus beetle feeding inside a seed.

The scanning laser vibrometer or scanning laser Doppler vibrometer, was first developed by the British loudspeaker company, Celestion, around 1979, further developed in the 1980s, and commercially introduced by Ometron, Ltd around 1986. It is an instrument for rapid non-contact measurement and imaging of vibration.

Fields where they are applied include automotive, medical, aerospace, micro system and information technology as well as for quality and production control. The optimization of vibration and acoustic behavior are important goals of product development in all of these fields because they are often among the key characteristics that determine a product's success in the market. They are also in widespread use throughout many universities conducting basic and applied research in areas that include structural dynamics, modal analysis, acoustic optimization and non-destructive evaluation.

The operating principle is based on the Doppler effect, which occurs when light is back-scattered from a vibrating surface. Both velocity and displacement can be determined by analyzing the optical signals in different ways. A scanning laser vibrometer integrates computer-controlled X,Y scanning mirrors and a video camera inside an optical head. The laser is scanned point-by-point over the test object's surface to provide a large number of very high spatial resolution measurements. This sequentially measured vibration data can be used to calculate and visualize animated deflection shapes in the relevant frequency bands from frequency domain analysis. Alternatively, data can be acquired in the time domain to, for example, generate animations showing wave propagation across structures. In contrast to contact measuring methods, the test object is unaffected by the vibration measuring process.

Vibrometry covers a huge range of applications such as the study of microstructures moving only a few pm at frequencies up to 2.5 GHz, all the way up to the intense dynamics occurring in Formula 1 engines with vibration velocities approaching 30 m/s.

A 3D scanning vibrometer combines three optical sensors that accurately detect dynamic movement from different directions in space in order to completely determine the 3D vectors of motion. The software allows each individual x-, y- or z-direction component to be displayed independently, or combined into a single representation. Data can be exported for finite element model validation at nodes previously imported from the model for scan grid definition.
