= Paul I Mataranga =

Medieval Albanian Lord of the Mataranga family

Paul I Mataranga Pal Matrënga
- Sevastocrator; Lord of Ghora
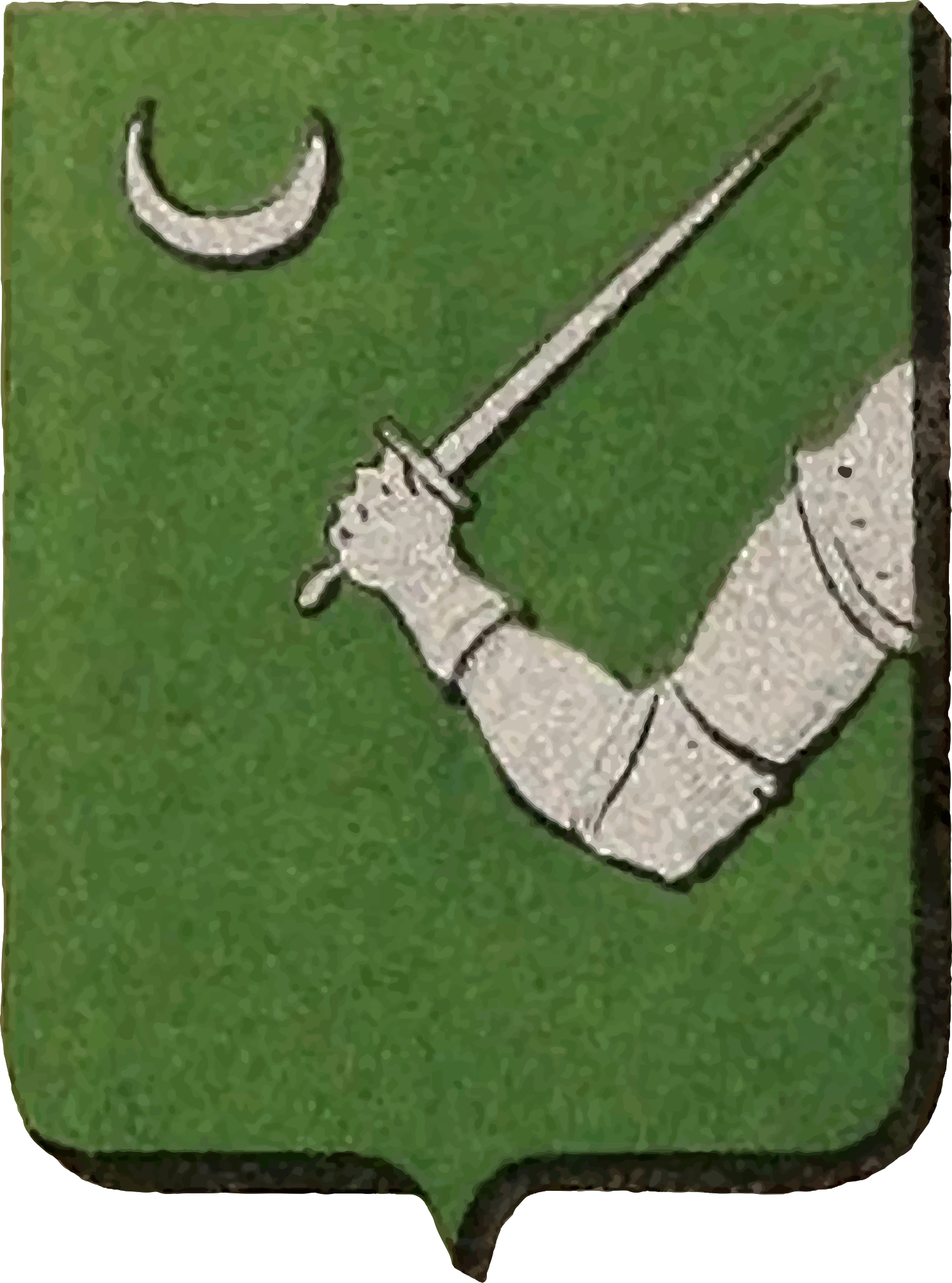
- Coat of Arms of the Mataranga family

Lord of Ghora
- Reign: Unknown
- Successor: Euphemia Mataranga
- Died: Unknown
- Spouse: Unknown
- Issue: Euphemia Mataranga; Gjin Mataranga
- House: Mataranga
- Father: Unknown
- Mother: Unknown
- Religion: Eastern Orthodoxy

Paul I Mataranga (Albanian: Pal Matrënga), also known as Paul Matarango or Paolo Matarango, was an Albanian Lord and member of the Mataranga family.

== Life ==
Paul Mataranga was a feudal lord who held the prestigious title of Sevastocrator. He governed the province of Ghora (also spelled Gora), a region near Lake Ohrid. Although details about his parents, spouse, and early life remain obscure, his position as a ruler highlights his prominence in the region's medieval history. This is further evidenced by his mention in a papal letter dated 17 June 1319, emphasizing his significance during the period.

In 1319, Paul Mataranga was part of a coalition with other Albanian nobles against King Milutin of Serbia, which is sometimes credited to have been incited by Philip II, Latin Emperor and Pope John XXII in order to weaken Milutin's rule. At the time, Milutin's expansion in Albania had been hindered by a 1299 treaty with the Byzantines, which saw Durrës transferred to Byzantine control. The Angevins, including Philip, likely had interests in the region, particularly regarding territories Milutin held or claimed, including the area around Durrës. However, while external actors may have played a role, it seems probable that the Albanian lords, including Paul Mataranga, acted largely in their interests, challenging Milutin's authority in the Albanian territories. Pope John XXII referred to Paul as one of his 'dilecti filii' of Albania, a title indicating a close relationship with the Papacy. This suggests that, despite the division within the Mataranga family, with some members possibly distancing themselves from the Orthodox faith, Paul remained loyal to the Byzantium. This religious split within the family could have further influenced their political actions, potentially affecting territorial control in the Byzantine province.

== Family ==
Paul Mataranga's spouse is unknown. The couple had two children.

1. Euphemia Mataranga married Andrea II Muzaka, a member of the noble Muzaka family, around 1328. Through this marriage, she helped solidify a strong familial alliance between the Mataranga and Muzaka families. They had five children, and both Euphemia and Andrea were buried in the Church of Saint Anthony in Durrës, where their tomb is located beside the altar.
2. (Ghin) Gjin Mataranga unknown marriage, had one child Paul II Mataranga.

== See also ==
- Mataranga family

== Bibliography ==
- Ducellier, Alain (1981). La façade maritime de l'Albanie au Moyen Age Durazzo et Valona du XIe au XVe siècle [The maritime facade of Albania in the Middle Ages Durazzo and Valona from the 11th to the 15th century] (in French). Grèce.
- Elsie, Robert (2003). Early Albania A Reader of Historical Texts, 11th-17th Centuries. Harrassowitz. ISBN 978-3-4470-4783-8.
- Fine, John V. A. (1994). The Late Medieval Balkans: A Critical Survey from the Late Twelfth Century to the Ottoman Conquest. University of Michigan Press. ISBN 978-0-4720-8260-5.
- Hopf, Karl (1873). Chroniques greco-romanes inedites ou peu connues [Unpublished or little-known Greco-Roman chronicles] (in French). Weidmann.
- Szende, Katalin (2000). Annual of Medieval Studies At Ceu (PDF). Central European University, Department of Medieval Studies.
