= Ibrahim Kodra Foundation =

Swiss art froundation

Ibrahim Kodra Swiss Foundation
- Formation: 4 October 1993
- Founder: Behgjet Pacolli
- Legal status: Charitable foundation
- Headquarters: Via Cattori 7 6900 Paradiso, Ticino, Switzerland
- Region served: Worldwide
- President: Behgjet Pacolli
- Website: fondazioneibrahimkodra.org
- Formerly called: Fondazione per i bambini del Sakha (1993–2005); Fondazione per i ragazzi del mondo di Ibrahim Kodra (2005–2010)
- to preserve and promote the artistic legacy of the Albanian artist Ibrahim Kodra.

The Ibrahim Kodra Foundation, officially the Ibrahim Kodra Swiss Foundation (Italian: Fondazione Svizzera Ibrahim Kodra), is a Swiss art Foundation to protect, archive and promote an artist Ibrahim Kodra, but is also a charitable organization headquartered in Paradiso in the Canton of Ticino. Its purpose is to foster the growth of cultural relations between Switzerland, the Canton of Ticino and other countries of the world though artistic, educational, and humanitarian activity.

== History ==
The foundation was originally established in Lugano in 1993 under the name Fondazione per i bambini del Sakha with Behgjet Pacolli as its founding president. Its original scope was to provide humanitarian and medical aid to the children of the Sakha Republic. In 1993 the foundation changed its name to Fondazione per i ragazzi del mondo di Ibrahim Kodra (Foundation of Ibrahim Kodra for the Children of the world) and moved to Paradiso. Under the new name, the foundation took on an international focus and added artistic and cultural activities to its humanitarian ones. Following the death of Ibrahim Kodra in 2006, it increasingly worked to preserve his artistic legacy. In 2010, the organization's official name was changed to Fondazione Svizzera Ibrahim Kodra.

== Art exhibitions ==
- Ibrahim Kodra, Ibrahim Kodra Foundation, Elena Pontiggia (curator), Milan, Società per le Belle Arti ed Esposizione Permanente, Palazzo della Permanente, 2017
