= Euphemia Mataranga =

Medieval Albanian Noblewoman of the Mataranga family

Euphemia Mataranga Efimia Matrënga
- Despotess of Albania & Epirus
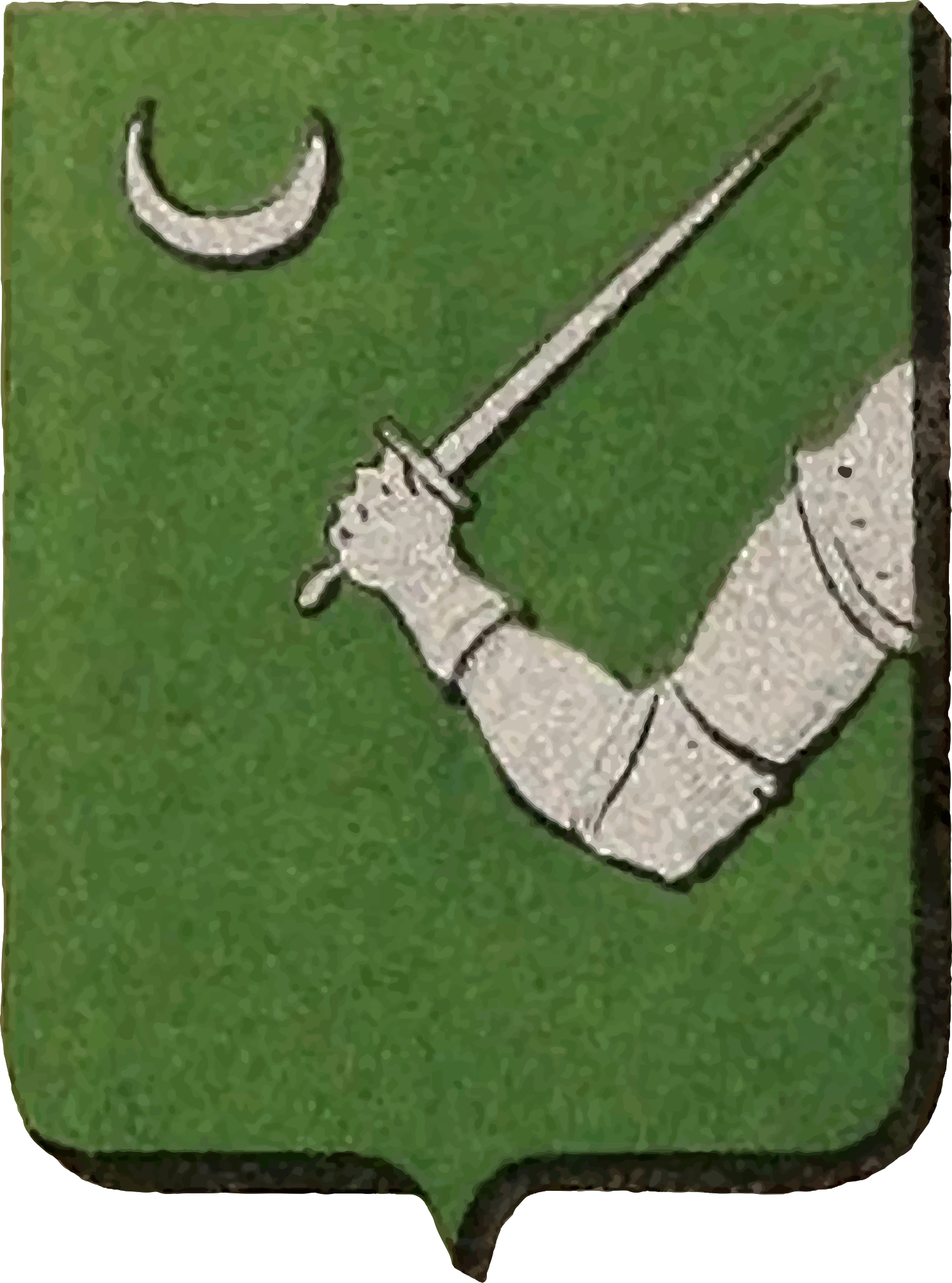
- Coat of Arms of the Mataranga family

Despotess Consort of Albania & Epirus
- Tenure: 1331–13??
- Born: 14th century
- Burial: St. Anthony Church, Durrës
- Spouse: Andrea II Muzaka (m. 1328; died 1372)
- Issue: Gjin I Muzaka; Teodor II Muzaka; Stoya Muzaka; Comita Muzaka; Chiranna Muzaka
- House: Mataranga
- Father: Paul I Mataranga
- Mother: Unknown
- Religion: Eastern Orthodox

Euphemia Mataranga (Albanian: Efimia Matrënga), also known as Euthymia, Eythvmia, Etimia or Onorata was an Albanian noblewoman and member of the Mataranga family.

== Life ==
Euphemia, whose name means "honored" was the daughter of Paul I Mataranga, an Albanian feudal lord who held the title of Sevastocrator and ruled the province of Ghora (Gora), situated near Lake Ohrid. The identity of her mother remains unknown, and not much is known about her early life.

She was married to Andrea II Muzaka most likely around 1328, in the Church of Saint Anthony in Durrës. Andrea came from the noble Muzaka family, and held the titles such as the Despot of Albania, Despot of Epirus and Sebastokrator similar to her father. Through his marriage to Euphemia, Andrea II Muzaka established a significant familial connection with her father, Paul Mataranga, thereby linking the Muzaka and Mataranga families.

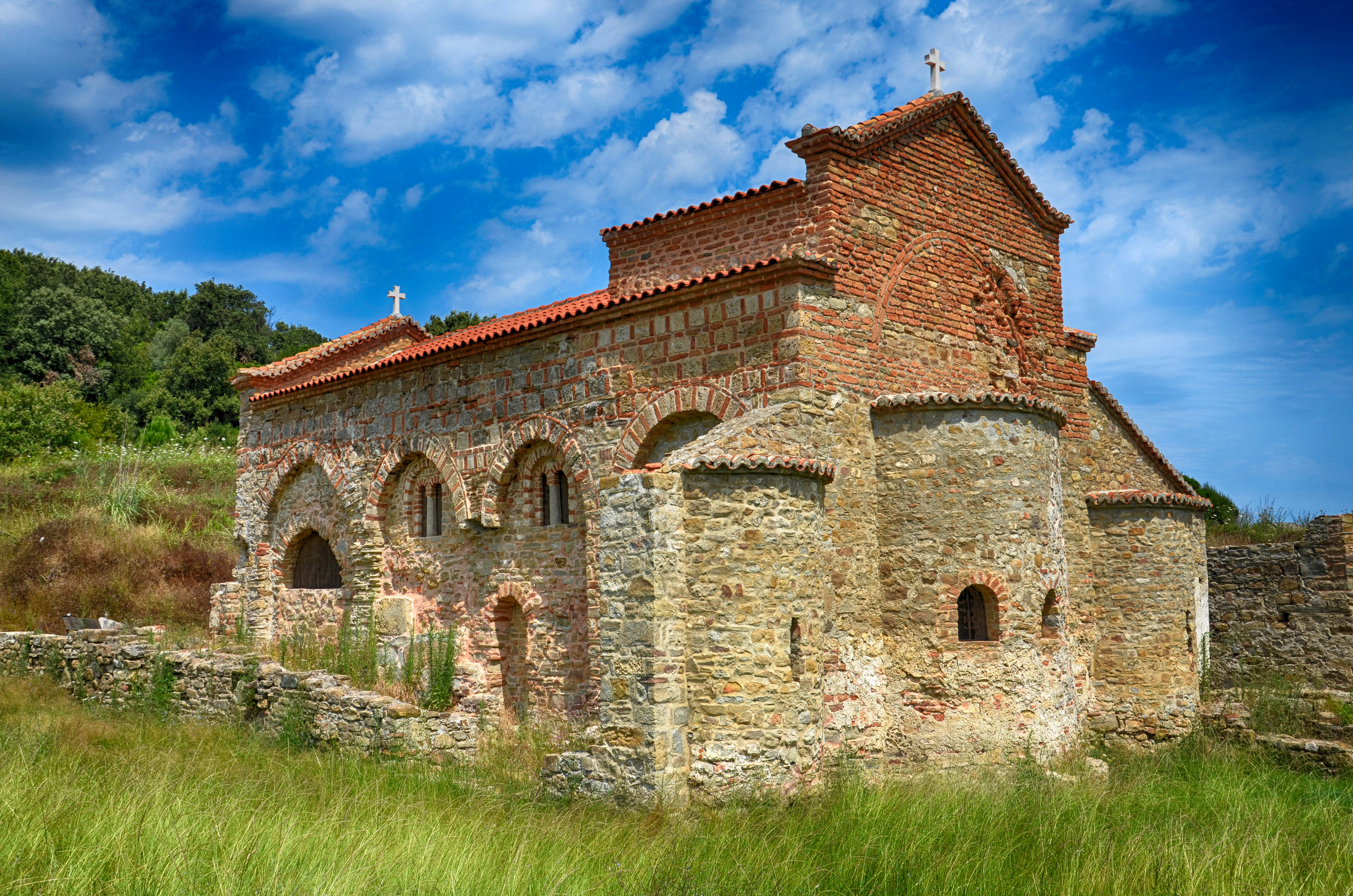
Church of Saint Anthony in Durrës where Euphemia and her husband Andrea II Muzaka were both married and later buried.

Euphemia and her husband, Andrea II Muzaka, were both buried in Durrës, in the Church of Saint Anthony where they had previously been married. Their tomb was positioned to the right of the altar. The beautifully crafted marble grave bore an epitaph that read: "Here lies Lord Andrew Molosachi, Despot of Epirus".

== Family ==
Euphemia Mataranga married Andrea II Muzaka. The couple had five children:

1. Gjin I Muzaka (* around 1337; † 1389), who inherited most of his fathers lands, with the exception of Berat, Myzeqe and Kastoria. He married Lady Suina Arianiti-Comneniates, a daughter of the Albanian Lord Materango Arianiti, with whom he had 5 sons: Andrea III Muzaka, Materango Muzaka, Vlash Muzaka, Bogdan Muzaka and Laldi Muzaka
2. Teodor II Muzaka (* 1337; † after 1389), who inherited Berat and Myzeqe.
3. Stoya Muzaka († after 1384), who inherited Kastoria as well as its villages and estates. Unfortunately, he died early with no heirs, therefore his lands were passed down to his elder brother Gjin.
4. Lady Comita (or Komnene) Muzaka († 1392), who married Balsha II and secured an alliance between the Muzaka family and the Balsha family
5. Lady Chiranna Muzaka (also: Kyranna), who married Andrea Gropa of Ohër and Dibra. The couple had no living issue, thus their property was inherited by the Muzakas.

== See also ==
- Mataranga family

== Bibliography ==
- Duka, Ferit (2004). Muzakajt - Lidhëz e Fuqishme Midis Kohëve Paraosmane dhe Osmane [The Muzakas – A Powerful Link Between the Pre-Ottoman and the Ottoman Time] (in Albanian). Qendra e Studimeve Albanologjike.
- Elsie, Robert (2003). Early Albania A Reader of Historical Texts, 11th-17th Centuries. Harrassowitz. ISBN 978-3-4470-4783-8.
- Hopf, Karl (1873). Chroniques greco-romanes inedites ou peu connues [Unpublished or little-known Greco-Roman chronicles] (in French). Weidmann.
- Qeriqi, Ahmet (2023). The Stone of the Oath. novum pro Verlag. ISBN 978-1-6426-8417-9.
- Sainty, Guy Stair (2018). The Constantinian Order of Saint George and the Angeli, Farnese and Bourbon families which governed it. Boletín Oficial del Estado. ISBN 978-8-4340-2506-6.
- Szende, Katalin (2000). Annual of Medieval Studies At Ceu (PDF). Central European University, Department of Medieval Studies.
