= Ibrahim Kodra =

Albanian painter (1918–2006)

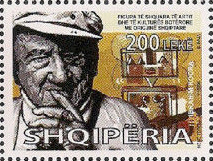
- Kodra on a 2008 stamp of Albania
- Born: Ibrahim Likmetaj Kodra; 22 April 1918; Ishëm, Albania
- Died: 7 February 2006 (aged 87); Milan, Italy
- Education: Accademia di Brera, Milan
- Known for: Painting, drawing, writing
- Awards: Honor of the Nation
- Website: ibrahimkodra.com

Ibrahim Likmetaj Kodra (22 April 1918 – 7 February 2006) was an Albanian painter.

== Biography ==
Kodra was born in Ishëm (Ishmi), Albania, son of Murat and Xhixhe. His mother died when he was young, and he did not receive adequate treatment from his stepmother. His father was working in the Commercial Marine.
Ibrahim took art classes from Odhise Paskali during 1929, focusing on sport as well. Kodra practiced discus and hammer throw, without pretending any professional career in sport, since those disciplines were not even present in Albania at that time. While taking drawing classes, one of his drawings would come into the focus of Queen Geraldine. This would change his course of life, and later it would be speculated that he was friend of Prince Tati and part of the royal circle, which was not true, though it never seriously bothered the artist. In 1938, he went to Italy to study fine arts supported by a scholarship from the Albanian Kingdom, and there he won a second scholarship from the Italian government as an emerging talent with the intervention of Jacomoni, and went to study in Milan in the Academy of Fine Arts of Brera.

In 1944 he opened his first workshop in Milan; in 1948 he opened a personal and group exposition in the "Art Club" in Rome, where he met and became a friend of Pablo Picasso, which often will be contested on artistic reflections. In 1950 he painted frescos in the most important museums and buildings of Milan. Kodra then opened an exposition with Picasso, Henri Matisse, Amedeo Modigliani, Georges Rouault, Dufy and others in the Mostra del Disegno in Chiavari (Italy).

He had many other personal exhibitions all around the world, including:

- Collective exposition in "Paradise" with Pablo Picasso, Salvador Dalí, Matta, Ernst, Carlo Levi, Braque, etc.
- Collective exposition in "Mostra del disegno e dell'incisione contemporanea" in 1943 in Milan, with Emilio Vedova, Renato Guttuso, Giacomo Manzù, Cassinari, Morlotti, etc.
- Collective exposition in "Mostra del disegno italiano contemporaneo" in Chiavari 1954, with Pablo Picasso, Modigliani, Rouault and Dufy
- Collective exposition in Milan (Galleria Montenapoleone, 1954), with Joan Miró, Birolli, Delaunay, Ernst, Kokoschka, Léger and Severini
- Collective expo in the Stone Gallery in Newcastle with Corneille, Gear, Gleghorn, Michaux, Millares, etc.
- Numerous collectives in Milan, the Stone Gallery in Newcastle, "Senator" in Stuttgart, and also in the "New Art Center" in Zürich.
- Personal expo in Modern Art Gallery in Pristina.
- Personal expo in Princess Hall in New York and personal expo the "2D Gallery" in Sassari.

His works are in the Museum of Vatican, in the Chamber of Deputies (House of Representatives) of the Italian Parliament in Rome, in exclusive private collections all around the world. In 1996 he won the "Honor of the Nation" award from Albania (Albanian: Nderi i Kombit), and in 1997, shortly after painting Albania Fantastica he was appointed honorary consul and he was given a diplomatic passport to the Republic of Albania.

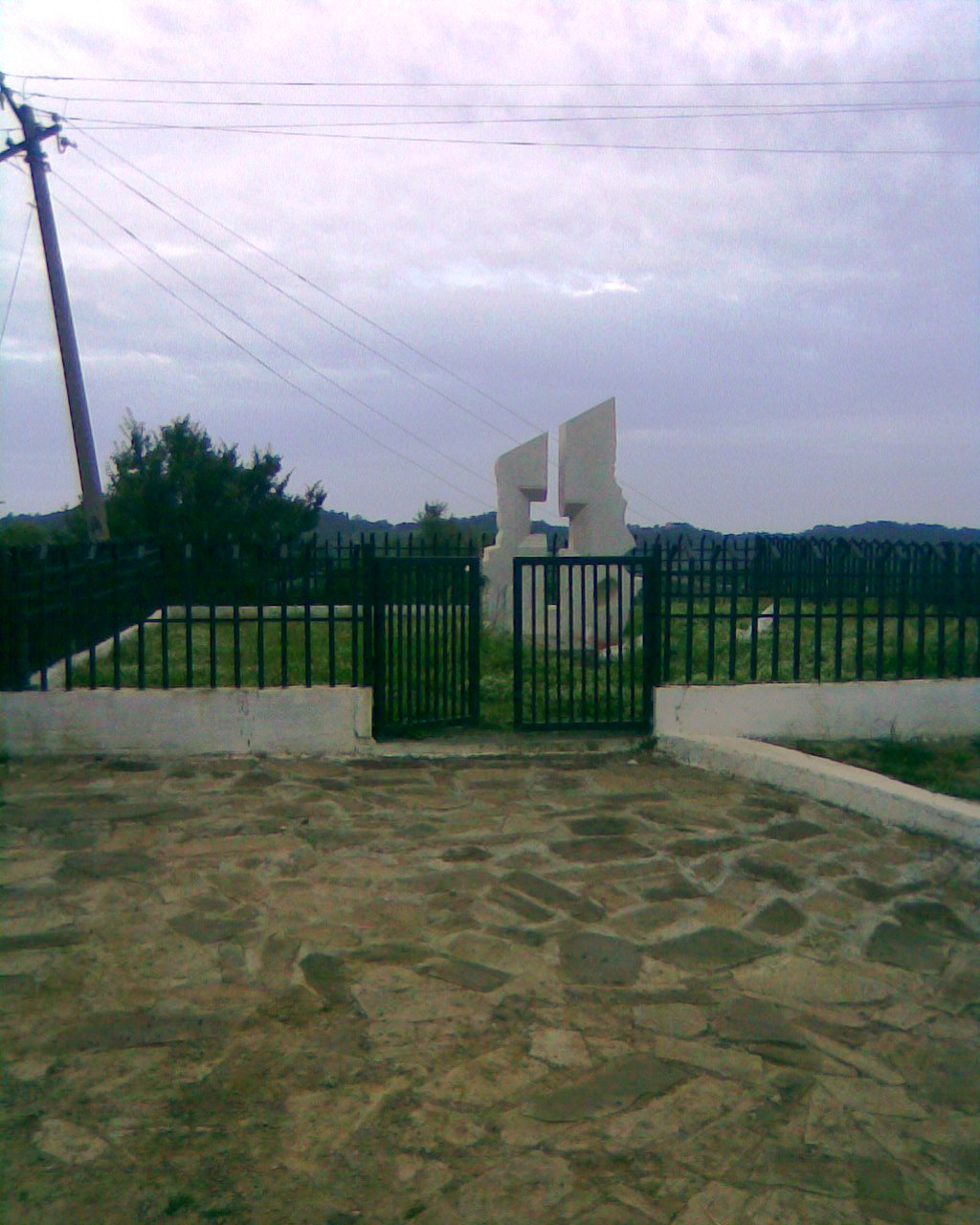
Tomb of Kodra in Ishëm.

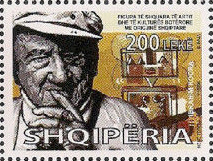
Kodra on a 2008 stamp of Albania

He died in Milan in 2006. Kodra was buried in front of Ishëm Castle according to his will to be buried there. His house in Milan is converted in a museum, with the initiative of Fatos Fasliu, president of "Ibrahim Kodra Foundation" in Milan. In February 2010, a museum dedicated to his work was opened in Melide, Lugano, with the support of Albanian entrepreneur Behgjet Pacolli and the "Ibrahim Kodra" Foundation (Fondazione per i Ragazzi del mondo di Ibrahim Kodra), a Swiss cultural organization supporting emerging art talents and promoting Kodra's work.

== Awards ==
- Honor of Nation Order, by President of the Republic of Albania, 1996

== Museum ==
Kodra works are kept in the Museum of the Vatican, in the Chamber of Deputies of the Italian Parliament, in the Kosova National Art Gallery of Pristina, in the collection of art of the Pinacoteca Tosio Martinengo, City of Milan, in the art gallery of the basilica santuario di Santa Maria de Finibus Terrae and of Santa Maria di Leuca.

== Style ==
The essential movements in his painting are Cubism and Abstractionism. He is the founder of a neocubism admired also by Pablo Picasso, who studied, experimented with, and reworked it, creating a personal metaphysical-geometric aesthetic. His paintings are composed of elegant geometric figures, which are understood both as a synthesis of reality and as a return to the primordial simplicity of human-produced art, whose features have been passed down in the ancestral culture of Primitivism.

== Catalogs and bibliography ==
- Kodra das Fantastische in der Kunst; Vernissage am 7. März 1984 ... anläßlich der Partnerstadt-Aktion "Die Lombardei & Mailand" (1984), OCLC 179755168, Frankfurt am Main – Hertie Zeil
- Ibrahim Kodra : opere degli anni '80 (1982), Michele Prisco; Giorgio Celli; Carmelo Strano, OCLC 849043385, Palermo – La Tela Petruso
- Ibrahim Kodra : colori d'acque e d'Albania, Aldo Gerbino; Ivan Caric; Giorgio Celli, OCLC 849043391
- Dal 13 al 28 marzo 1976 per una ricerca comune Ibrahim Kodra più Gigi Gherard (1976), OCLC 797452882, Monza – Galleria Agrati
- Kodra (1982), Paul Éluard; Enrico Crispolti; Renzo Bertoni, OCLC 849031229, Palermo – Edizioni Centro d'Arte La Tela
- Kodra, një univers (1992), Abdulla Tafa, OCLC 255014199, Tirana – Enti ART
- Il lungo inverno (The long winter) (1988), Roberto Ruberto; Ibrahim Kodra, OCLC 52561452, Milan – Rosone*Ibrahim Kodra : [Catalogue], Ibrahim Kodra, Antonino De Bono, OCLC 22099930, Series: Profili del Comanducci
- Il Carpine. Galleria d'arte (1966), Ibrahim Kodra, Walter Fedler, OCLC 25750755, Rome
- Solarità mediterranee (2004), Ibrahim Kodra, OCLC 60681846, Palermo – Palazzo della Regione
- Nga Ishmi në Brera : Kujtime (2000), Ibrahim Kodra, Demetrio Patituc̦it, ISBN 9789992730218, OCLC 48038281, Onufri, Tirana
- Ibrahim Kodra : artist file : study photographs and reproductions of works of art with accompanying documentation 1930?–1990, OCLC 855508359, New York – Museum of Modern Art
- Ibrahim Kodra (1974), Antonino De Bono, OCLC 487777958
- Ibrahim Kodra (1972), OCLC 717918057, La Spezia – Galleria Il Gabbiano
- Kodra (1974), Carlo Munari, OCLC 220465417, Milan – Collana d'oro maestri del mediterraneo
- Ibrahim Kodra e il Teatro Massimo (1997), OCLC 799494763, Palermo – Centro Paolo Borsellino
- Ibrahim Kodra : Palazzo Municipale dal 16/11 al 9/12/84 (1984), Ibrahim Kodra, Cernusco. Assessorato alla Cultura, OCLC 313541343, Milan – Tipogr. B.C.S. [Dr.].
- Ibrahim Kodra : 25 marzo-20 Aprile 1972 (1972), OCLC 2606927, Naples – Galleria d'arte "Il Tarlo"
- Ibrahim Kodra : mostra personale del pittore 14 marzo – 3 aprile 1959, Milan – Galleria Bergamini, OCLC 272565950
- Ibrahim Kodra : Galerija e Artit Prishtinë Jugosllavia, Korrik 1968 (1968), Anton Çetta, OCLC 780550902, Pristina, Yugoslavia – Umetnička Galerija Priština
- Ibrahim Kodra : omaggio a Positano (2006), Massimo Bignardi, OCLC 849322394
- Sav taj crtež : 17 međunarodnih izložba (originalnog) crteža (2009), Daina Glavočić; Ljubica Dujmović Kosovac; Andy Jelčić; Slobodan Drenovac, OCLC 781150027, ISBN 9789536501649, Rijeka (Croatia) – Muzej moderne i suvremene umjetnosti

== Gallery ==
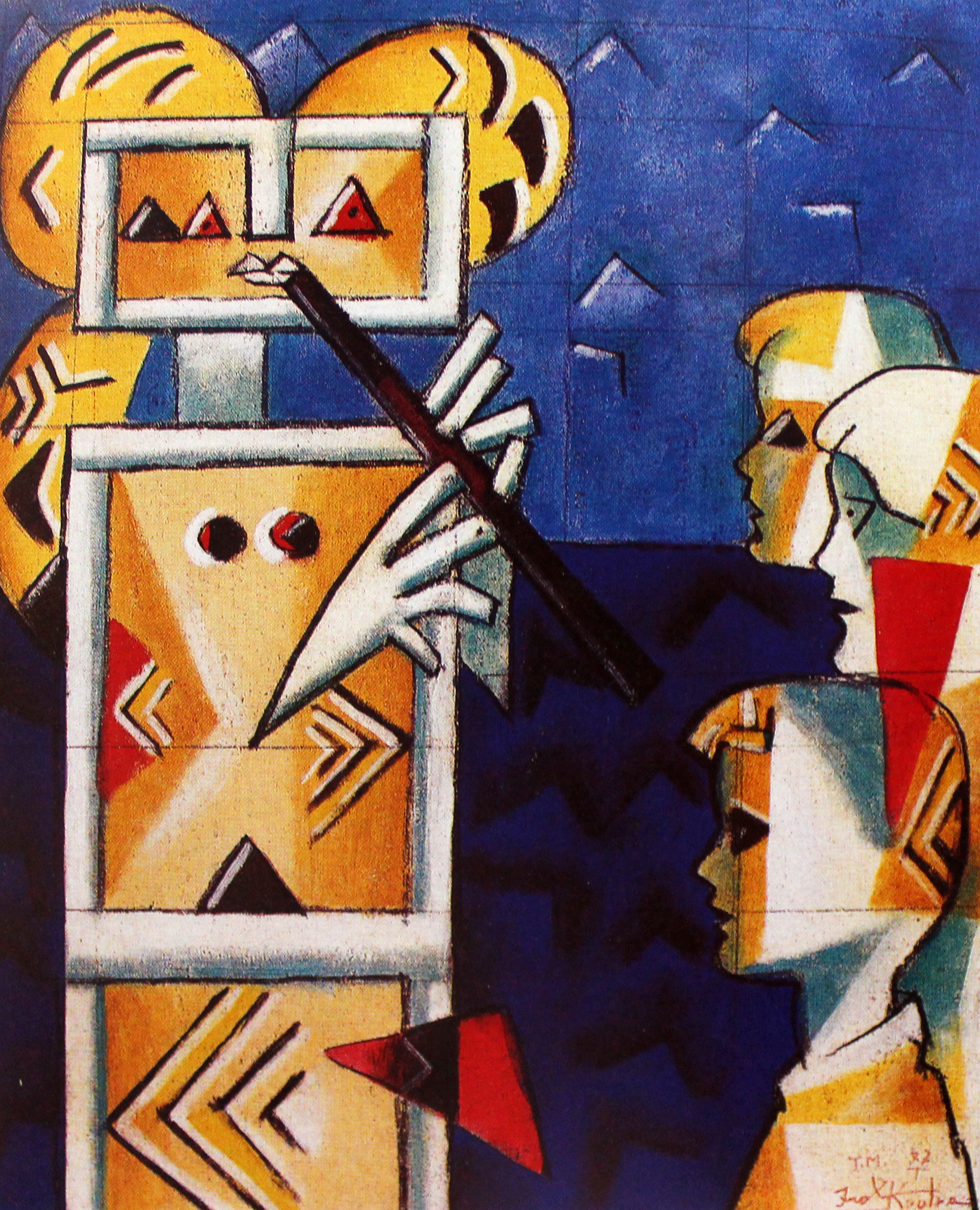
Music Lesson, 1997, oil on canvas, 80x100

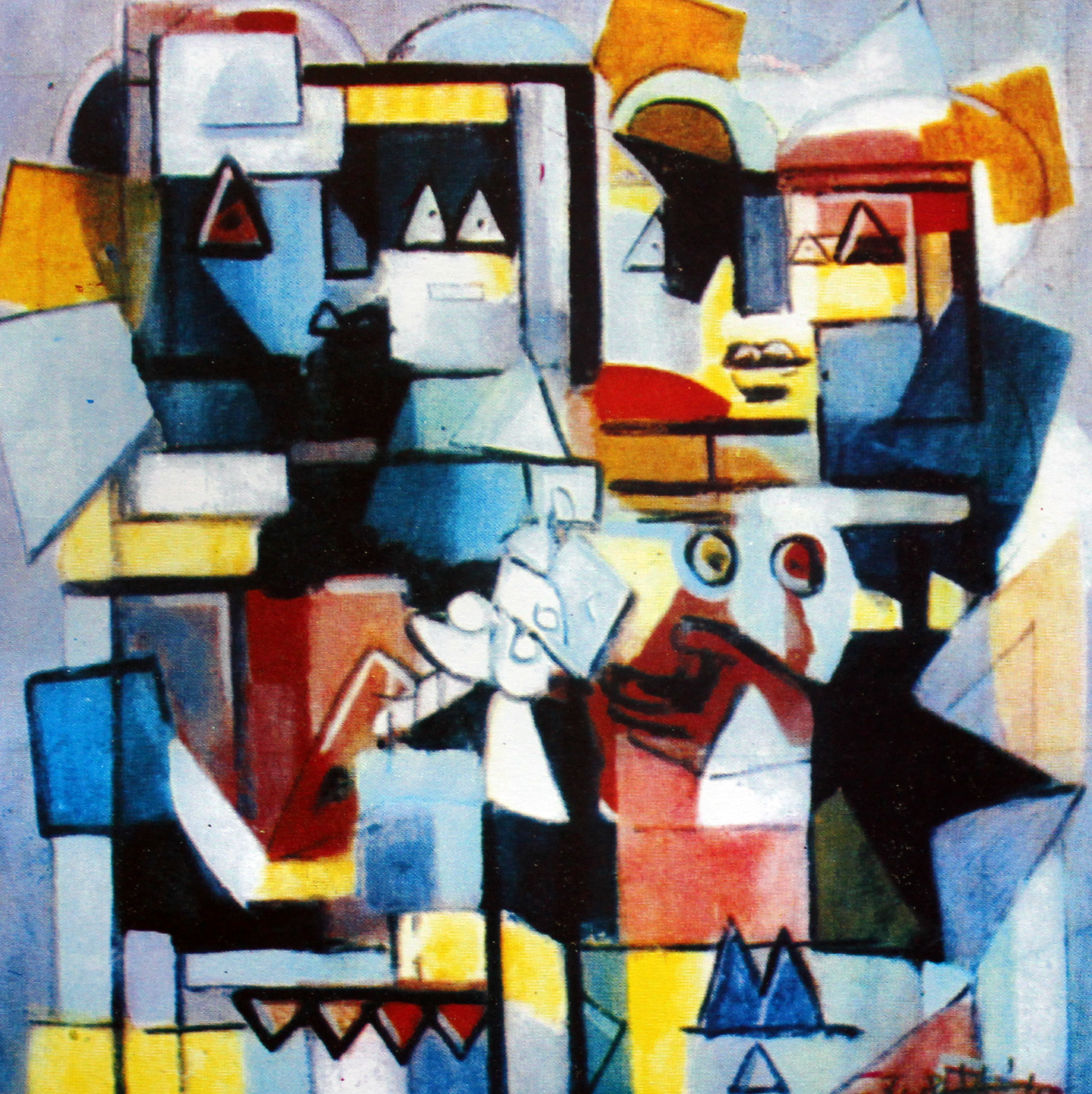
The date, 1987, oil on canvas, 80x100

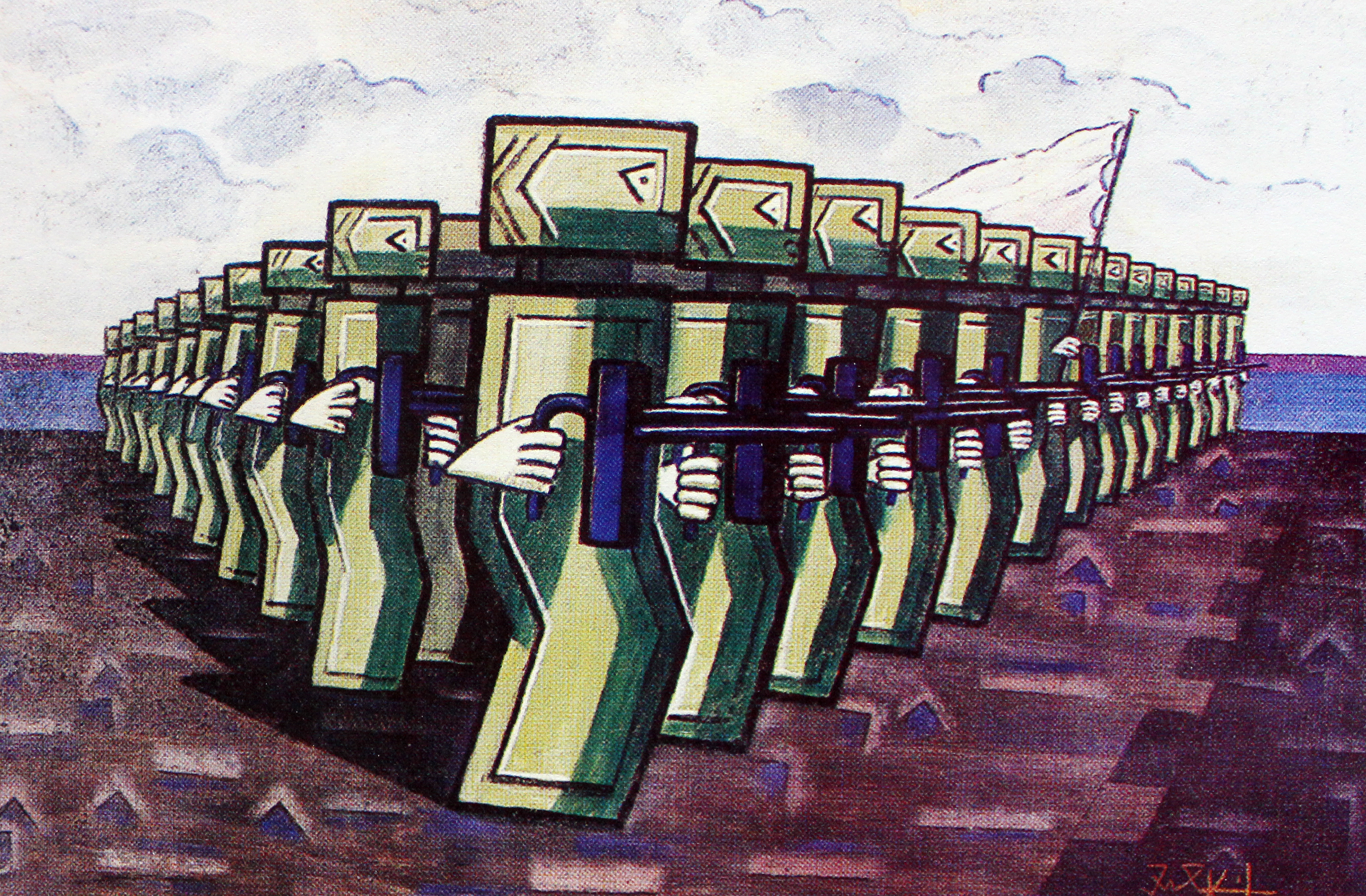
The war for peace, 1977, oil on canvas, 80x100

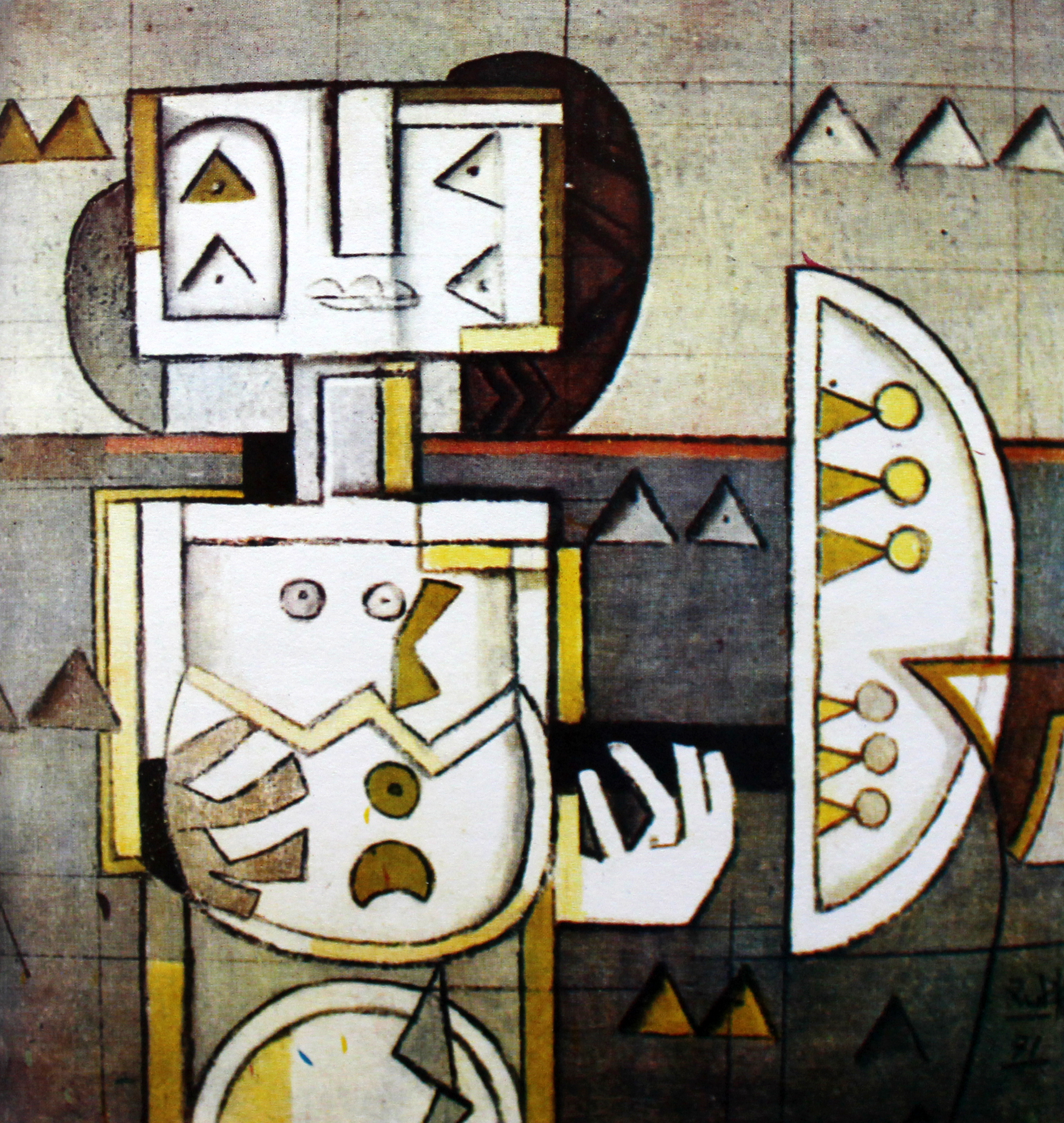
The birth of the idol, 1971, oil on canvas, 80x100

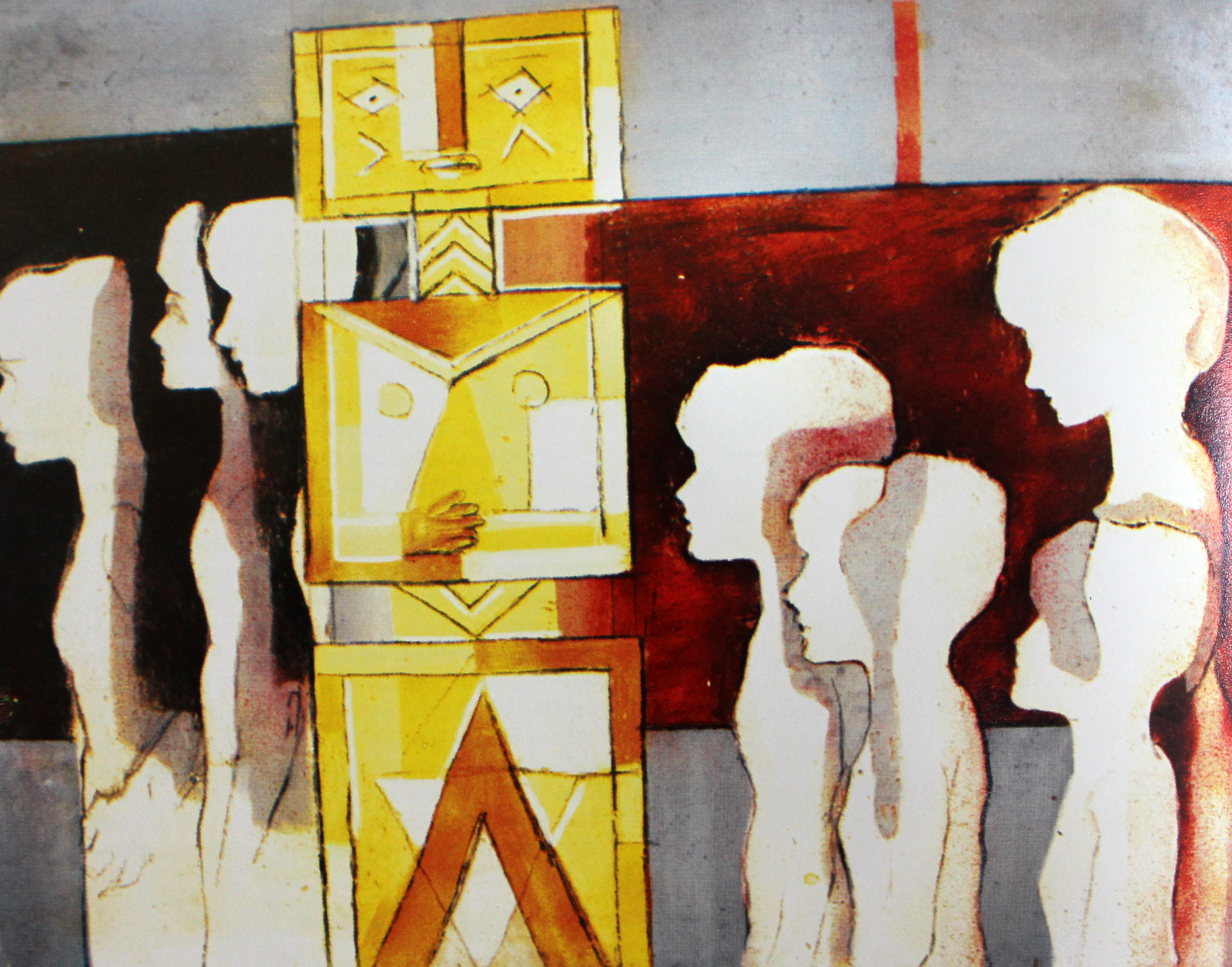
Seeking new idols, 1968, oil on canvas, 80x100

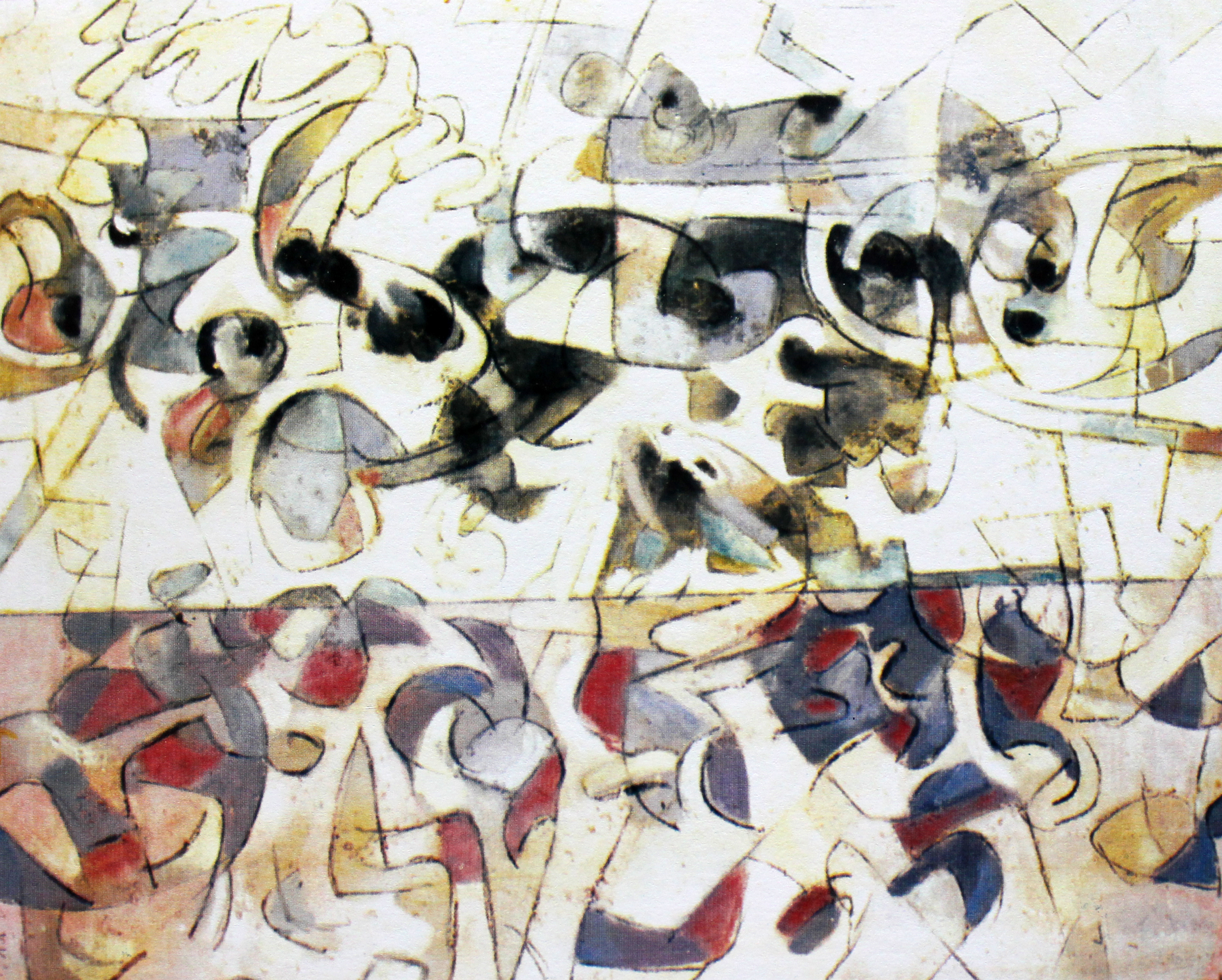
The sea, 1968, oil on canvas, 80x100
