= Ishëm =

- Administrative unit
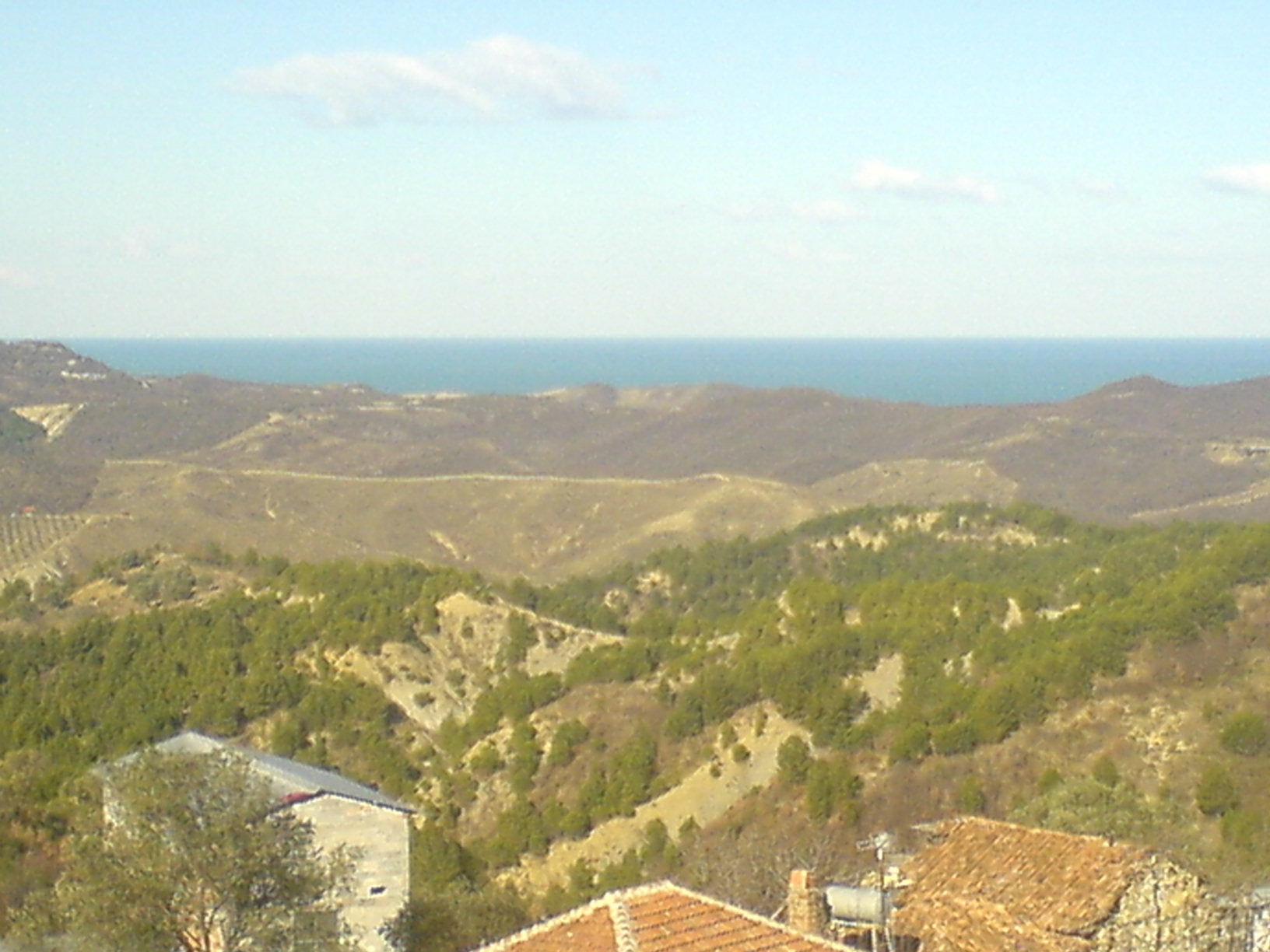
- View of Ishëm

- Location within Albania
- Coordinates: 41°32′N 19°36′E
- Country: Albania
- County: Durrës
- Municipality: Durrës

Population (2011)
  - Administrative unit: 5,001
- Time zone: UTC+1 (CET)
  - Summer (DST): UTC+2 (CEST)
- Postal Code: 2015
- Area Code: (0)576

Ishëm (Albanian definite form: Ishmi) is a former municipality in the Durrës County, northwestern Albania. At the 2015 local government reform it became a subdivision of the municipality Durrës. The population at the 2011 census was 5,001. Ishëm Castle is located in the municipal unit.

== Famous peoples ==
- Ibrahim Kodra

== Gallery ==
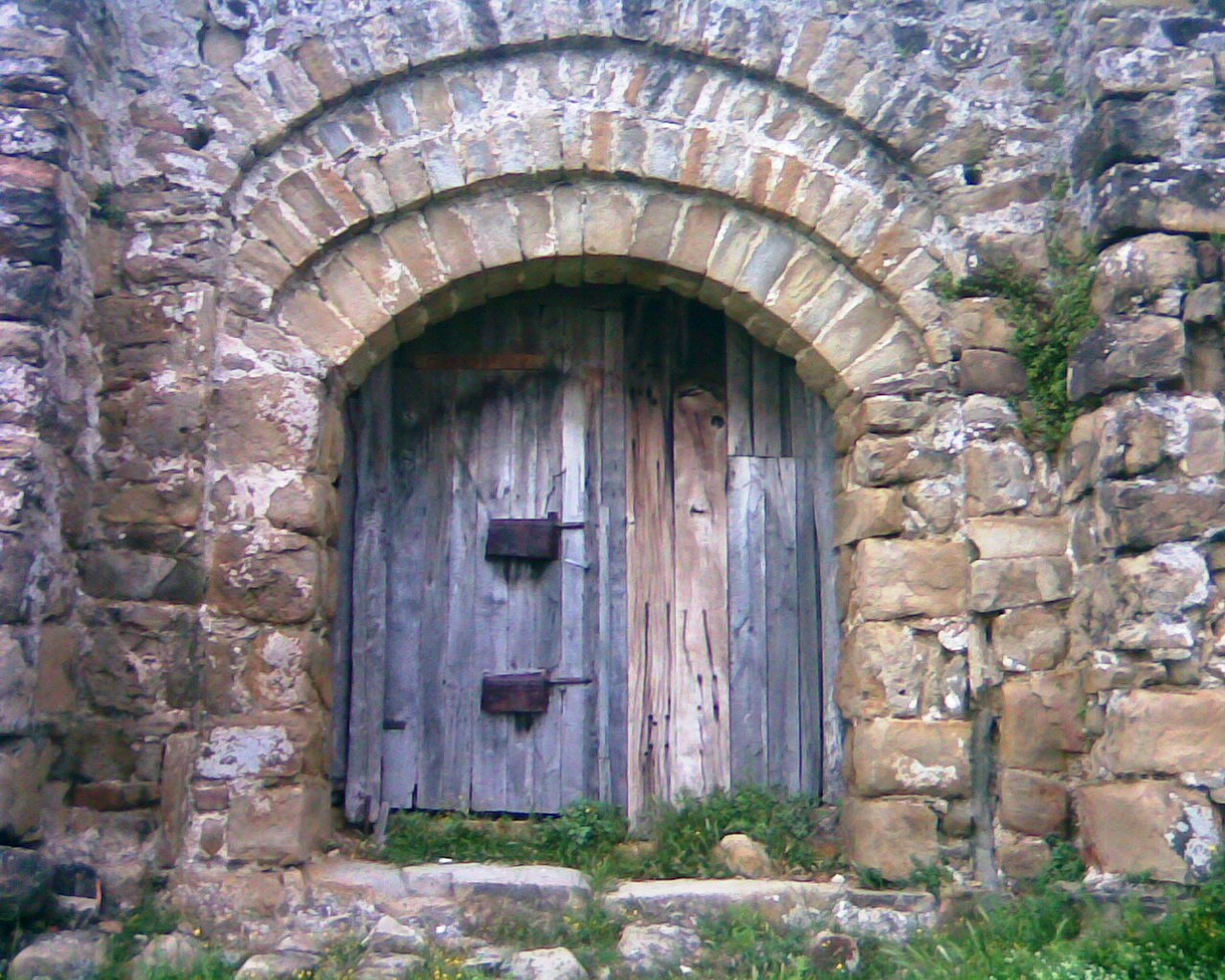
Ishëm Castle

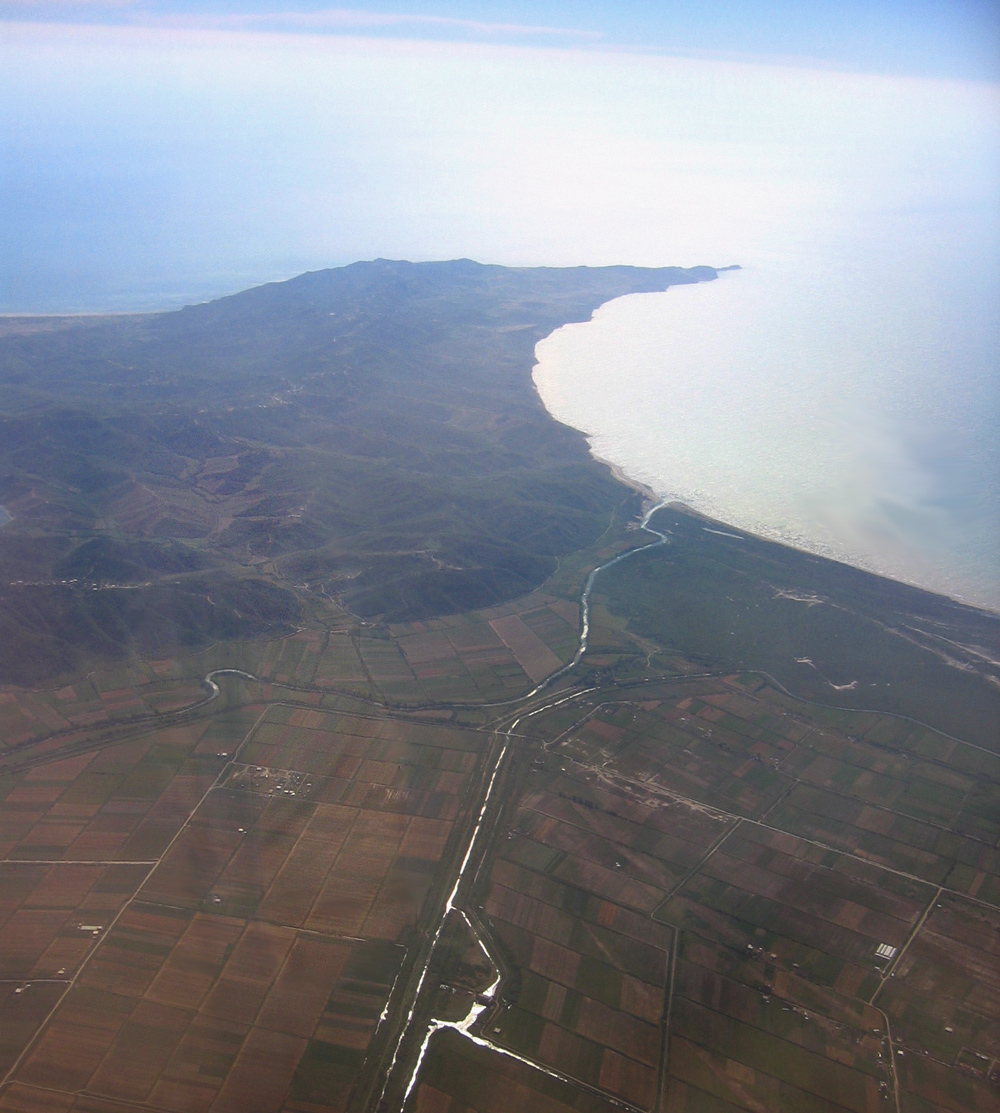
Cape of Rodon

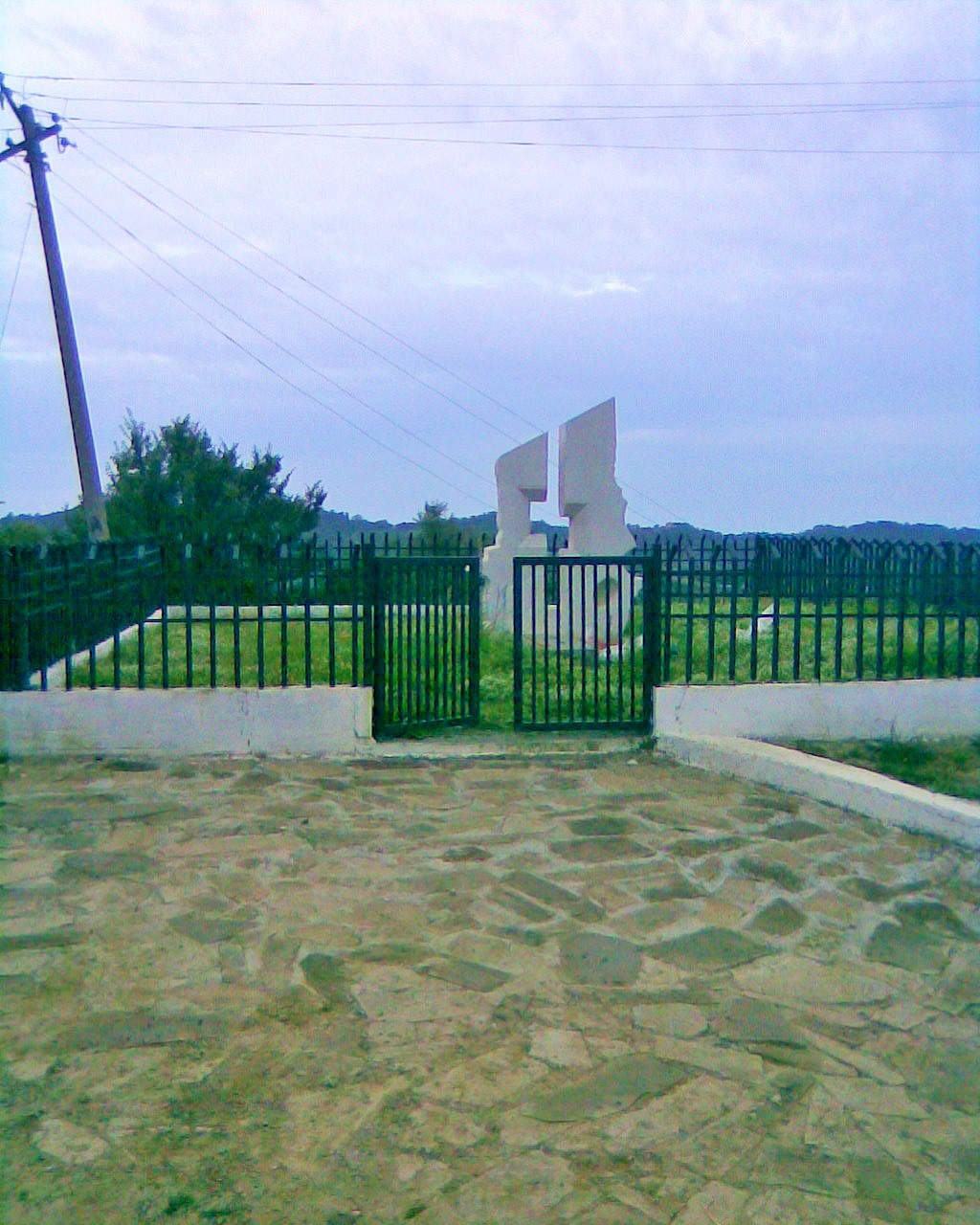
Ibrahim Kodra tomb

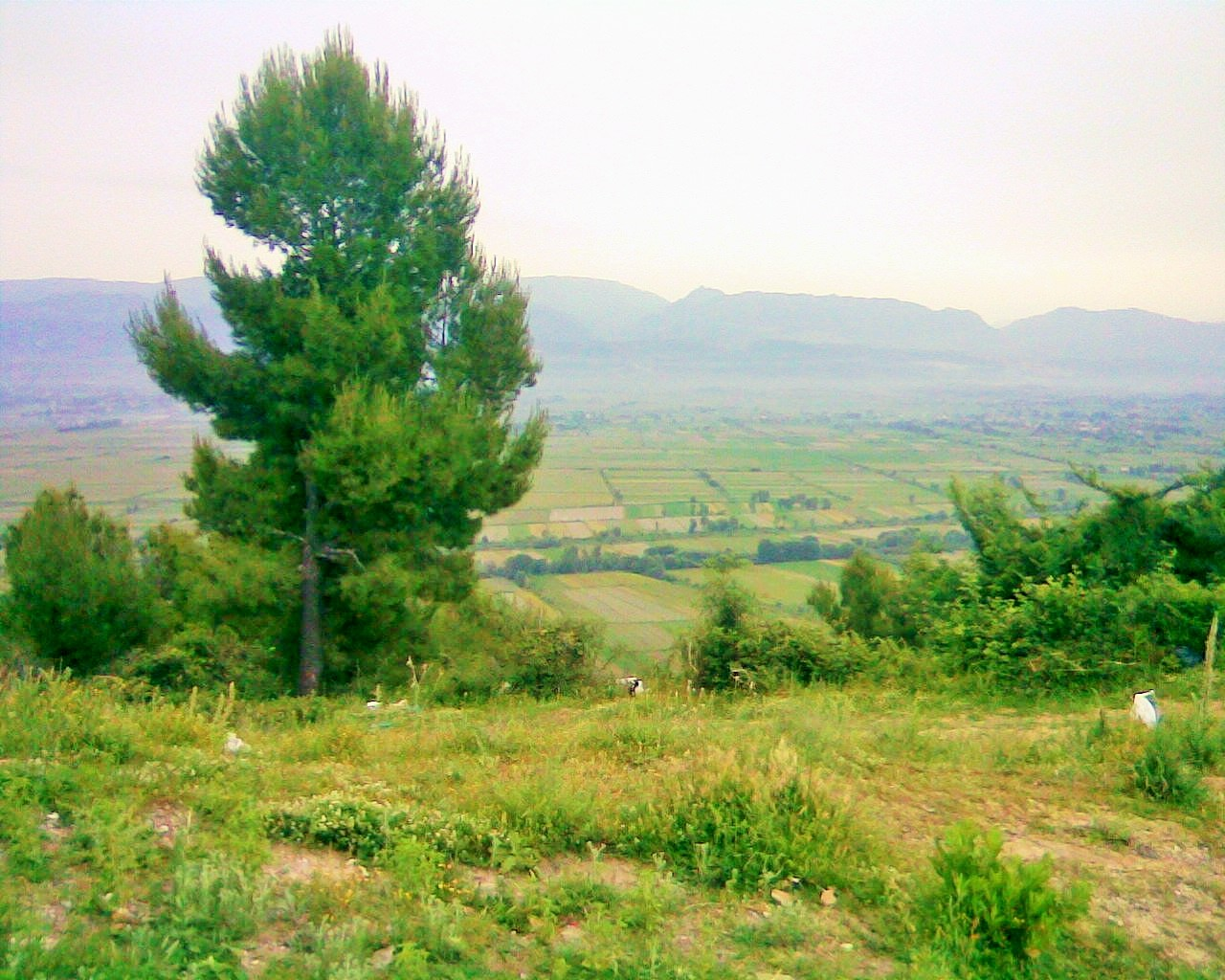
Ishëm

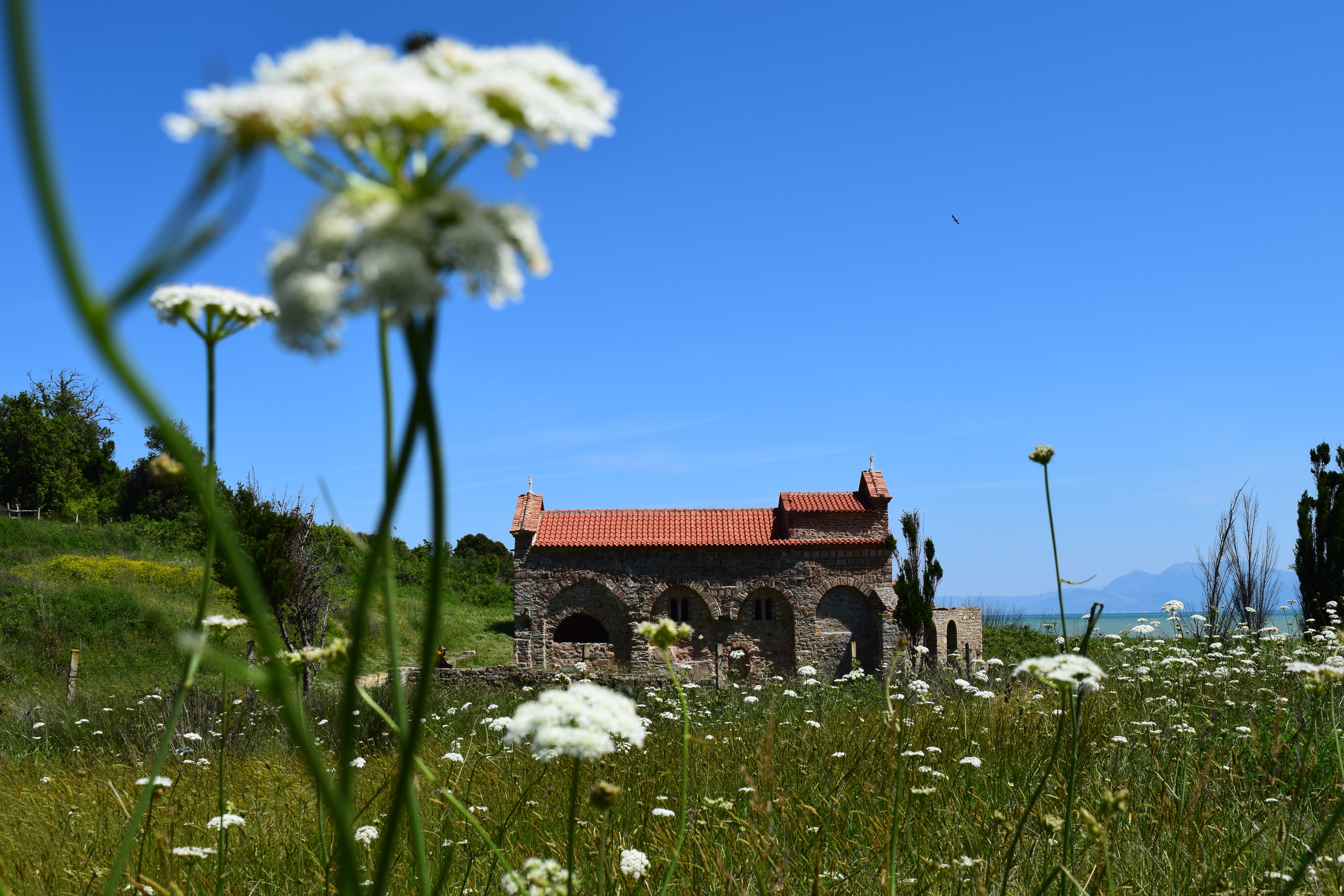
St. Anthony Church

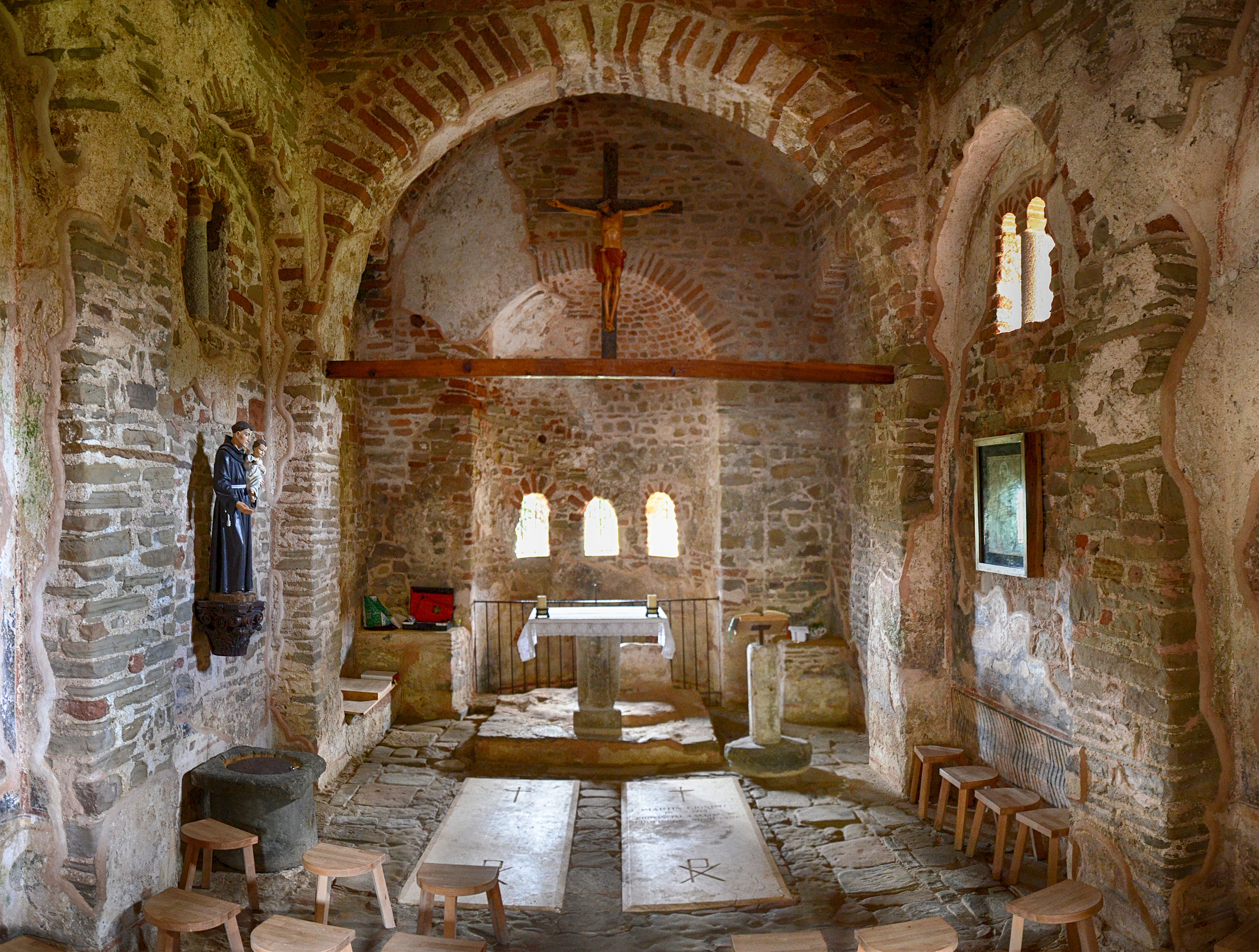
St. Anthony Church

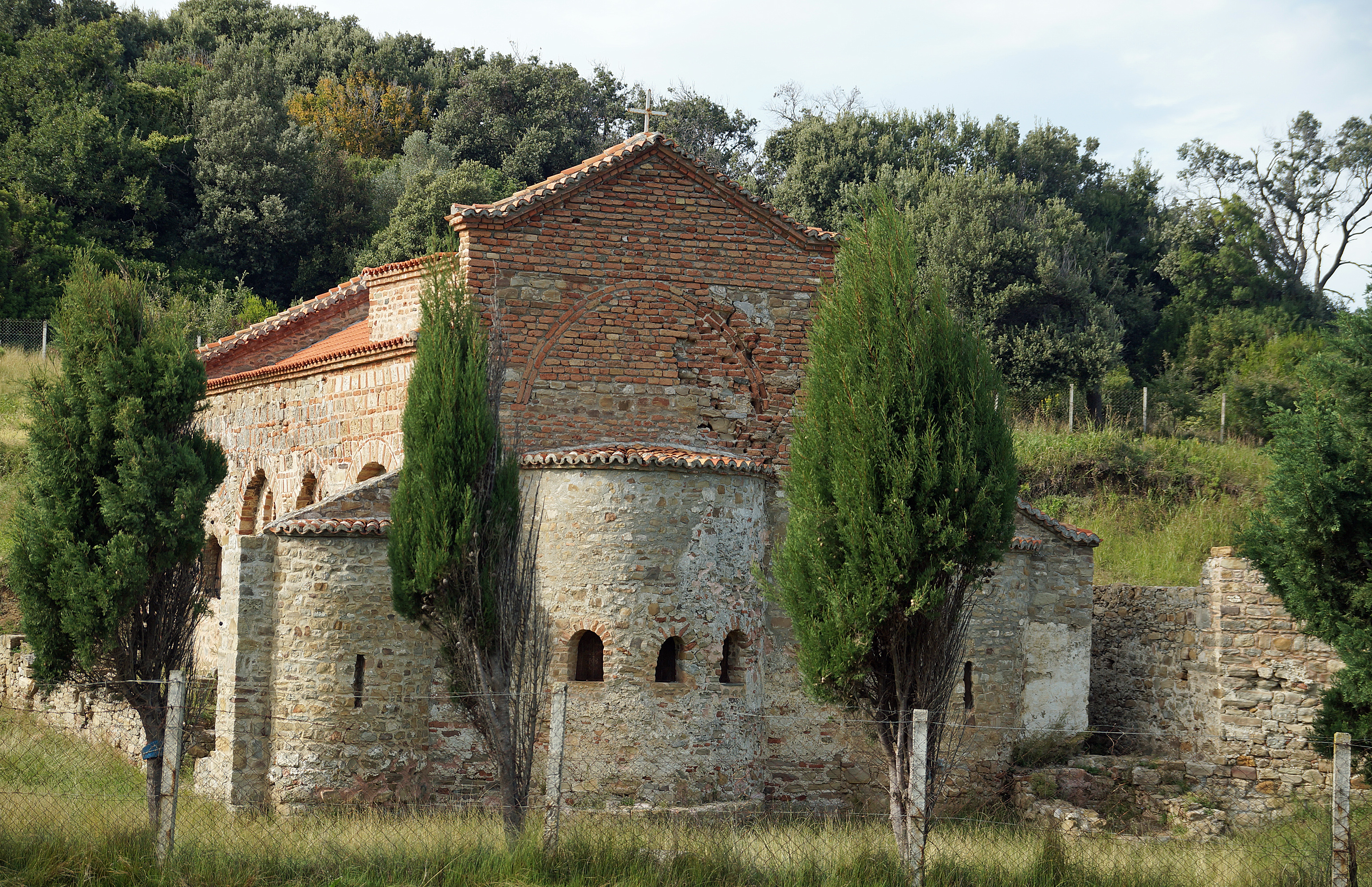
St. Anthony Church

== See ==
- Ishëm (river)
- Ishëm Castle
- Rodoni Castle
- Cape of Rodon
- St. Anthony Church, Durrës
