= Ishëm Castle =

Castle in Ishëm, Albania

Ishëm Castle Kalaja e Ishmit
- Ishëm, Durrës, Albania
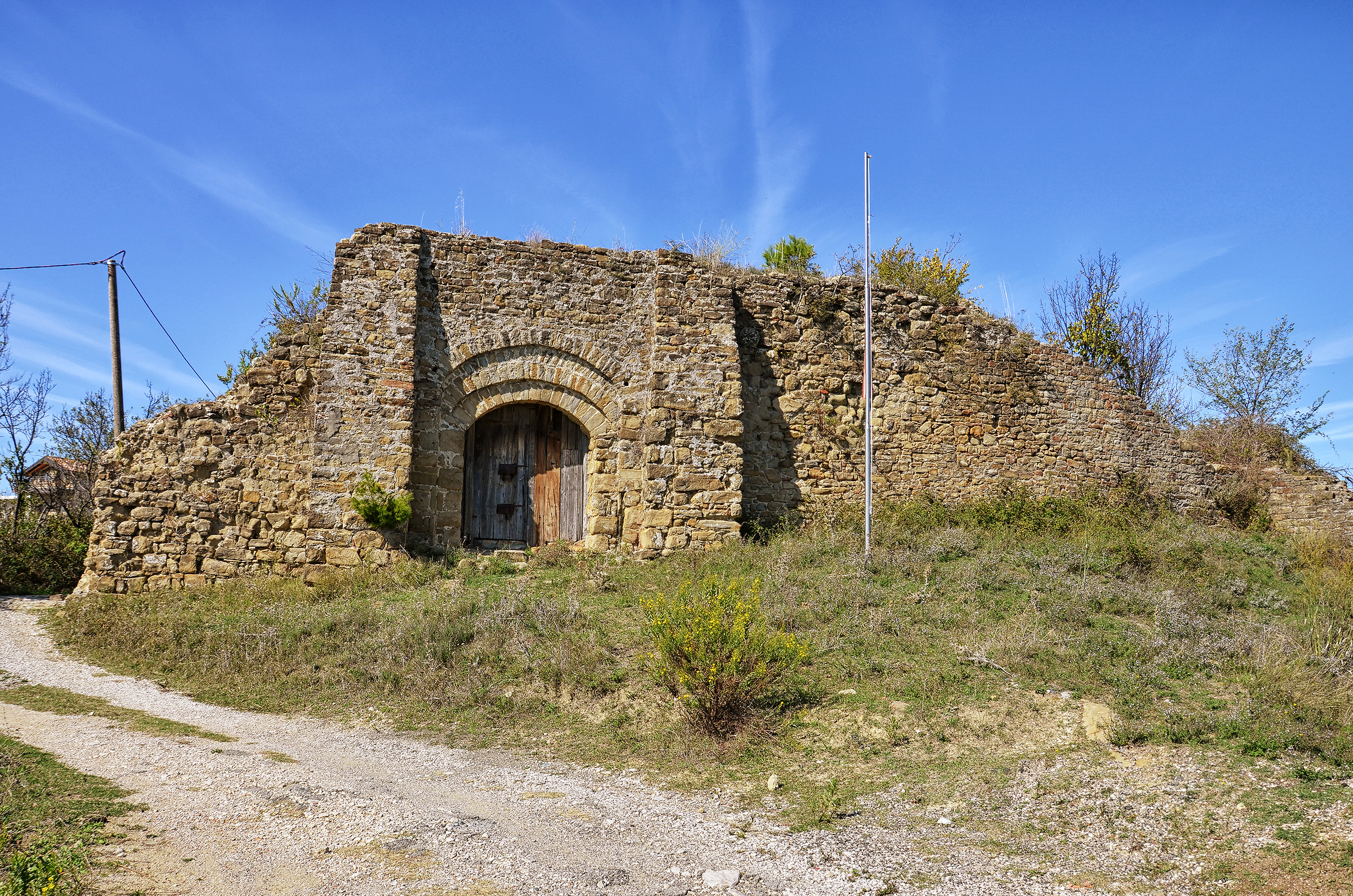

Site information
- Owner: Albania
- Controlled by: Ottoman Empire; Albania

Location
- Coordinates: 41.539406°N 19.595328°E

Site history
- Built: 16th century
- Built by: Ottoman Empire

Ishëm Castle
- Kalaja e Ishmit (Albanian)
- Interactive map of Ishëm Castle
- Location: In the center of Ishëm

History
- Built: 16th century

Site notes
- Architect: Ottoman Empire

Cultural Monument of Albania

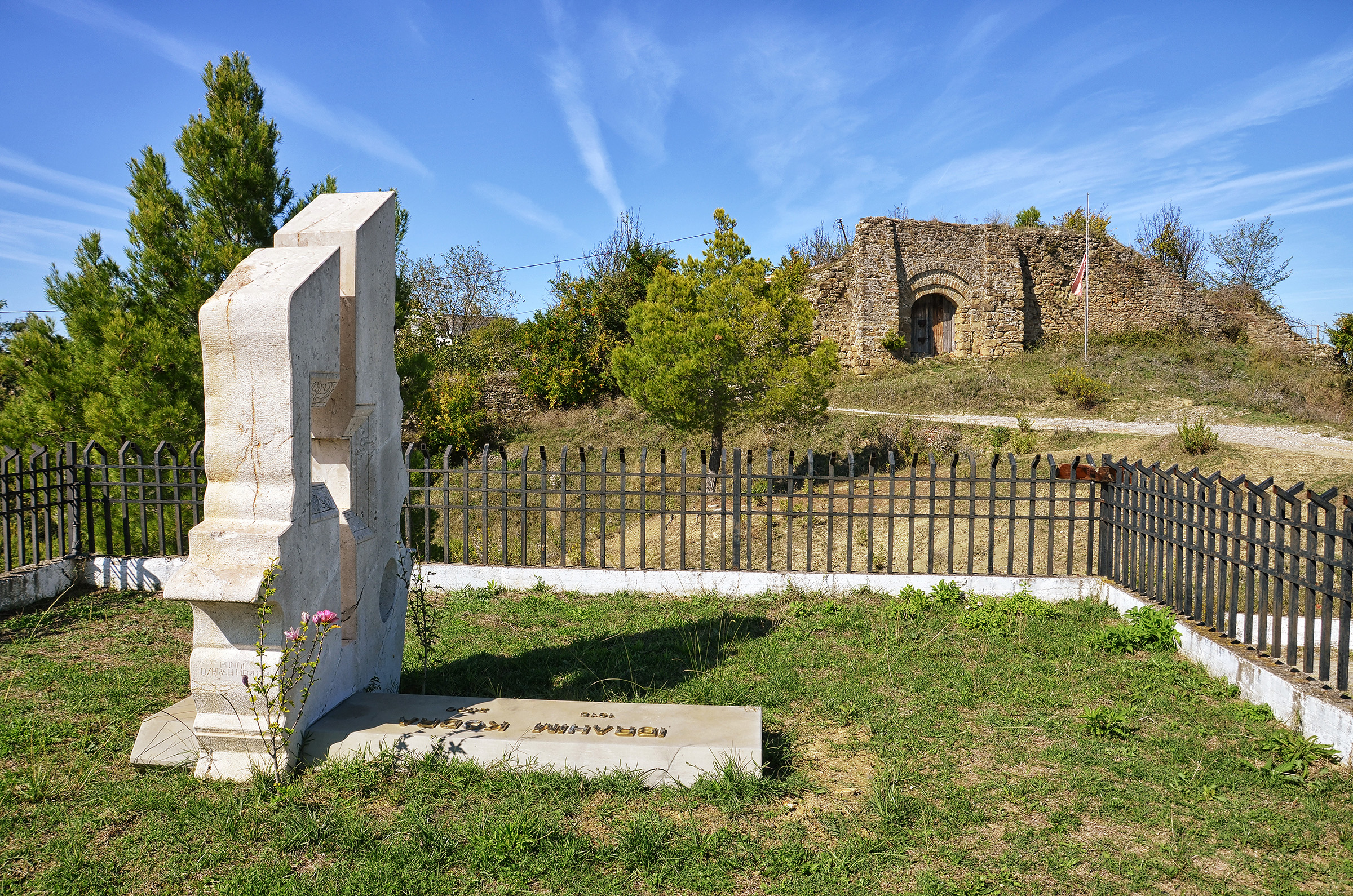
Grave of Ibrahim Kodra an Albanian painter in front of the Ishëm Castle

Ishëm Castle (Albanian:Kalaja e Ishmit) is a castle in Ishëm, Durrës County, Albania. It is located on a hill above the river Ishëm. It was built from 1572 to 1574 by Ottomans to stop the peasant rebellions. The Albanian painter Ibrahim Kodra was buried in front of it.

== See also ==
- Ishem
- List of castles in Albania
- Tourism in Albania
