= St. Anthony Church, Durrës =

Cultural Monument in Durrës, Albania

- Kisha e Shën Ndojt (Albanian)
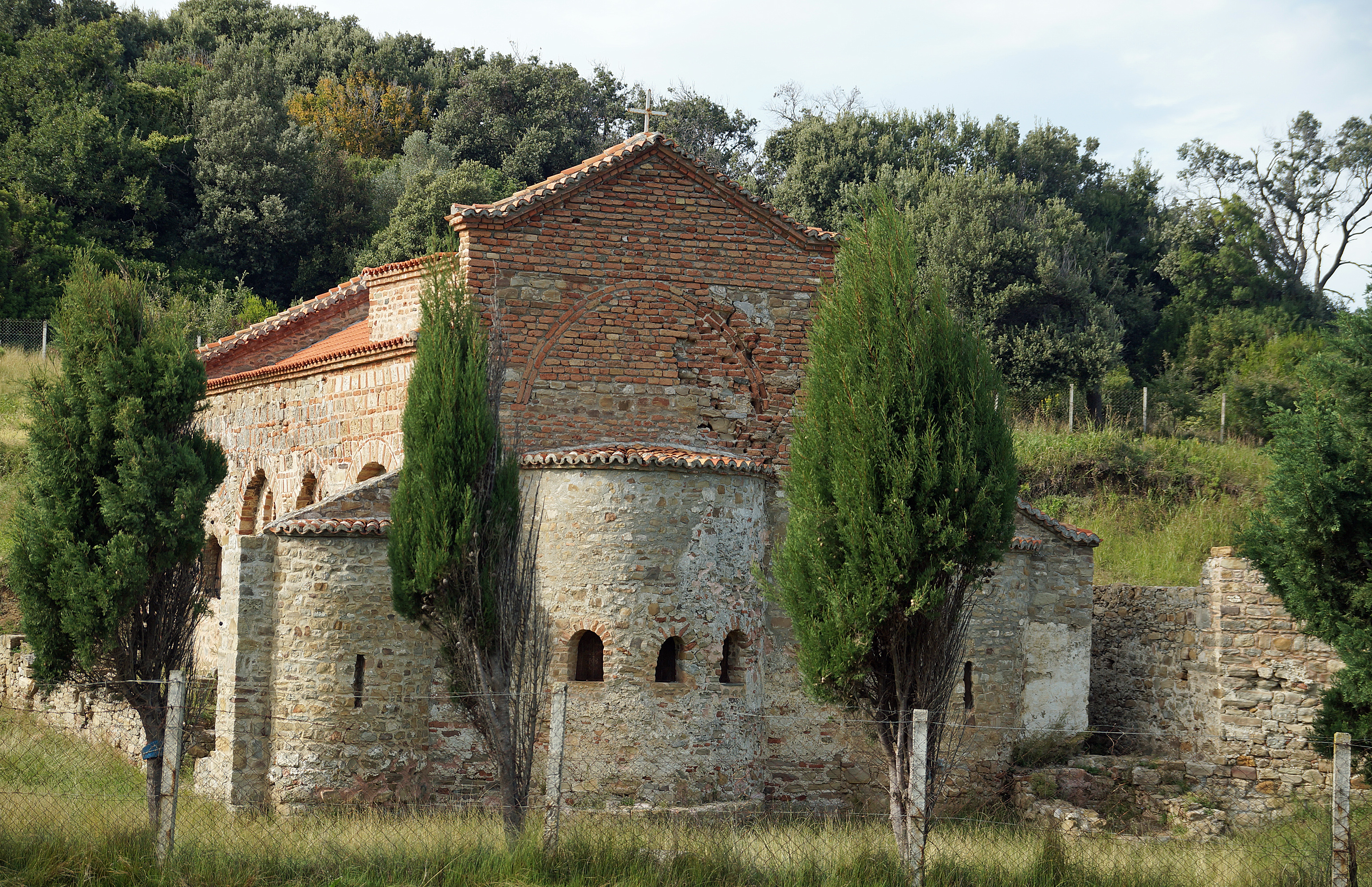
- East side of the building with apsis
- Interactive map of St. Anthony Church, Durrës
- 41.5830°N 19.4583°E
- Location: Ishëm, Durrës, Albania

Cultural Monument of Albania

The ruins of St. Anthony Church (Albanian: Kisha e Shën Ndojt) is located at Rodon Cape (alternatively known as Skanderbeg Cape) in Durrës County, is a Cultural Monument of Albania. It became a Cultural Monument in 1963. It is also the location where Andrea II Muzaka and his wife Euphemia Mataranga got married most likely around 1328, then buried later on.

== History ==
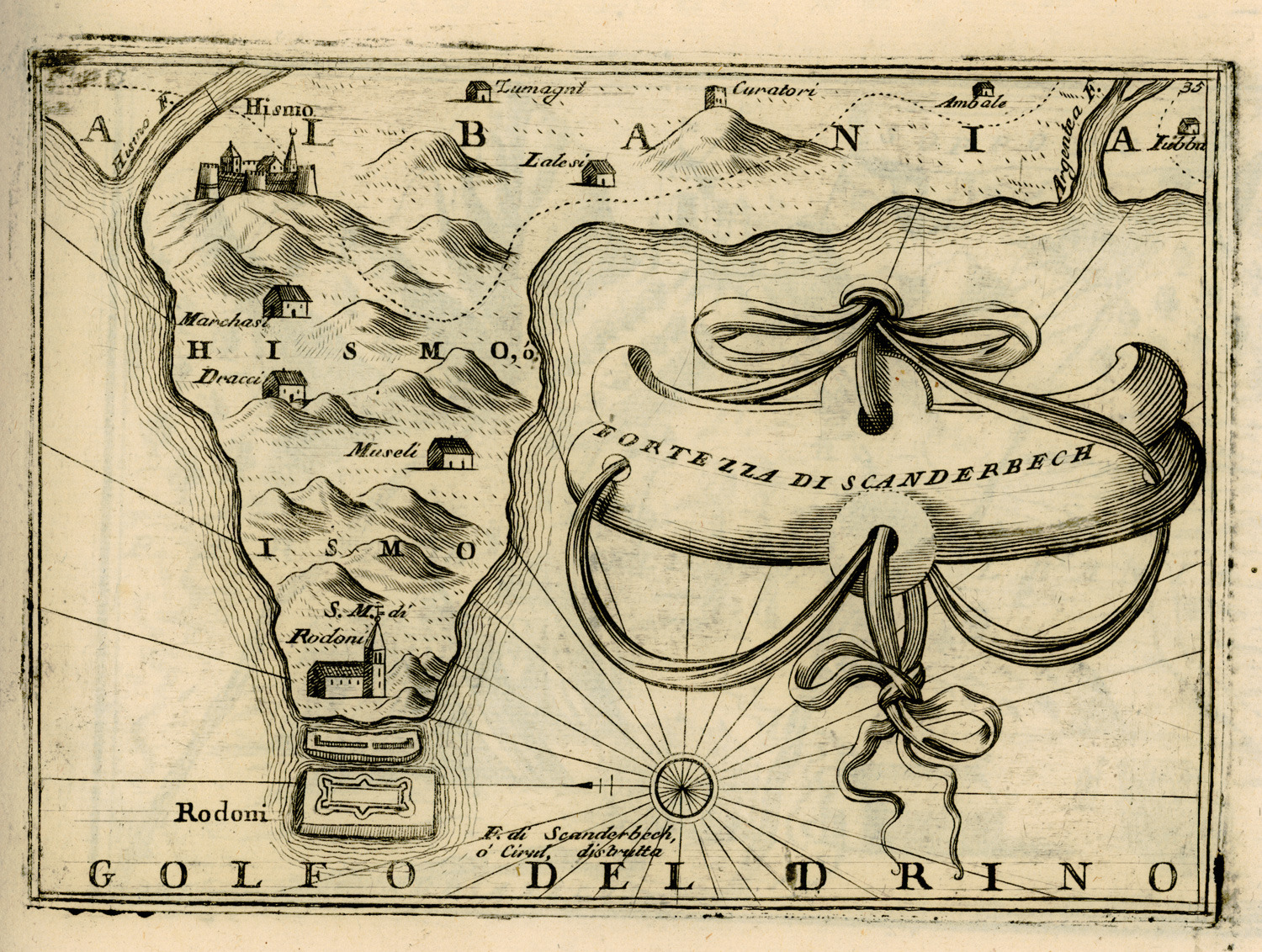
Map of the Cape of Rodon by Vincenzo Coronelli showing the Castle of Rodon and the St. Anthony Church

Saint Anthony Church was of the most popular churches of the area of the Albanian Medieval Period. This is also due to the construction of Skanderbeg's Castle in that Cape area in the 15th century, Indirectly it is called the Skanderbeg church.

Based on documents dated from 1418, the church is thought to have been principally connected to a Byzantine monastery dedicated to Saint Mary that was situated near the current church. The architectural style was Romano-Gothic. Later sources of 1599 show that at that period the monastery was dedicated to Saint Anthony of Padua and belonged to the Franciscans.

Up until 1852, when an earthquake demolished them, the church and monastery were still in operation. After their destruction, they left in ruins until 1978. By 2000, the church and parts of the monastery had been rebuilt into what it is now.

Inside the church there are some wall paintings, which include a two headed eagle and a horse with a female rider, who is believed to be Mamica Kastrioti.

== Gallery ==
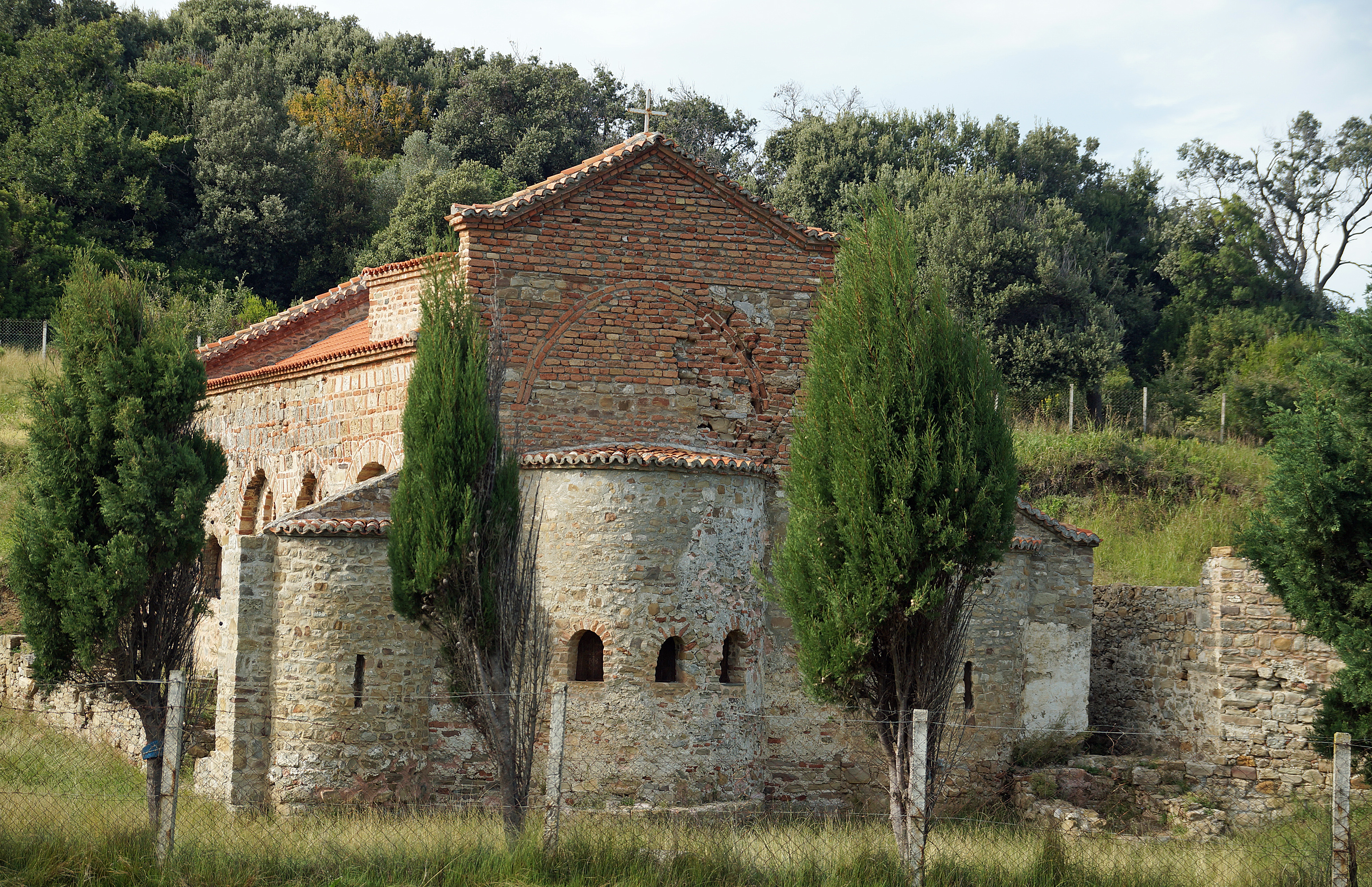
Back view.

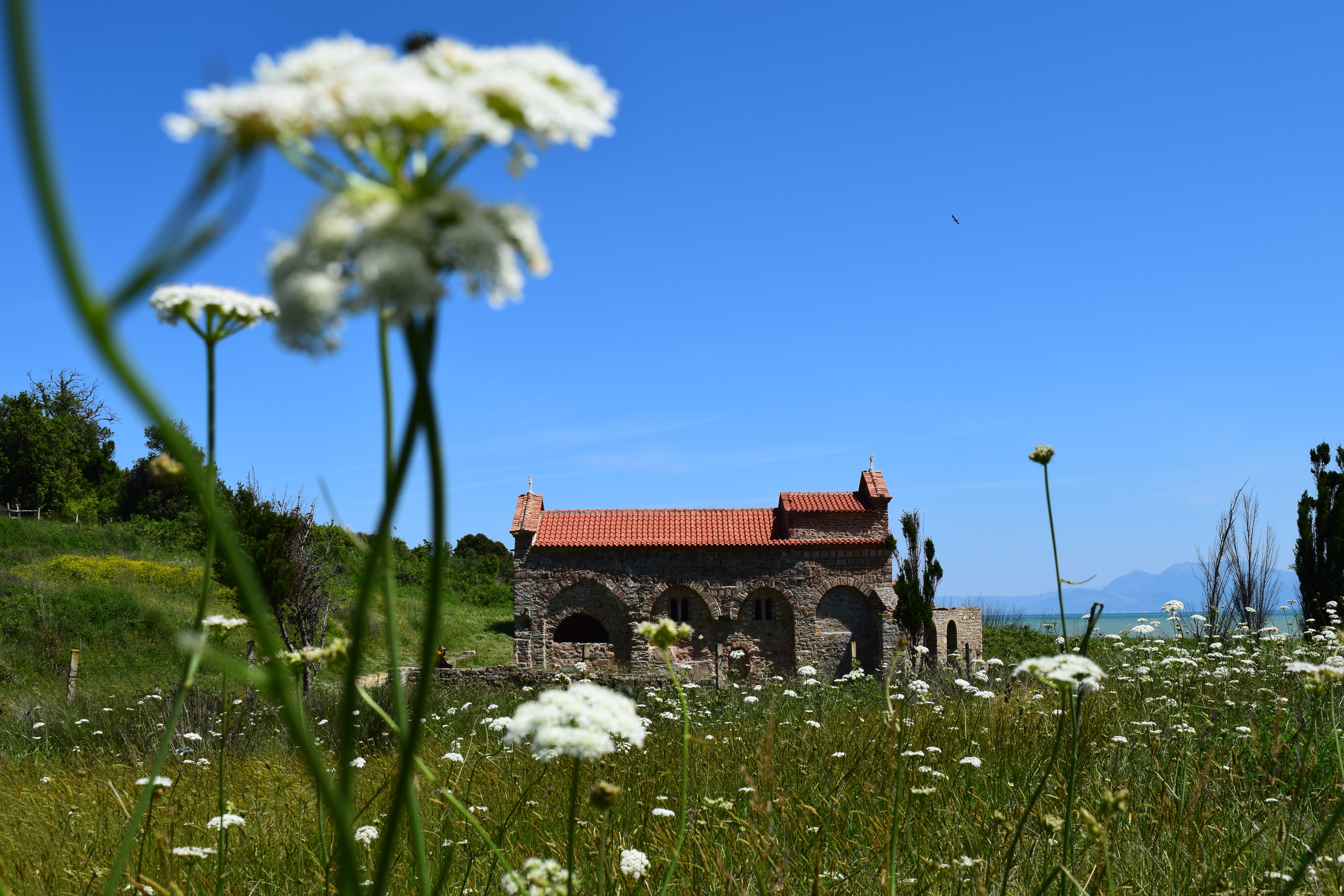
Side view.

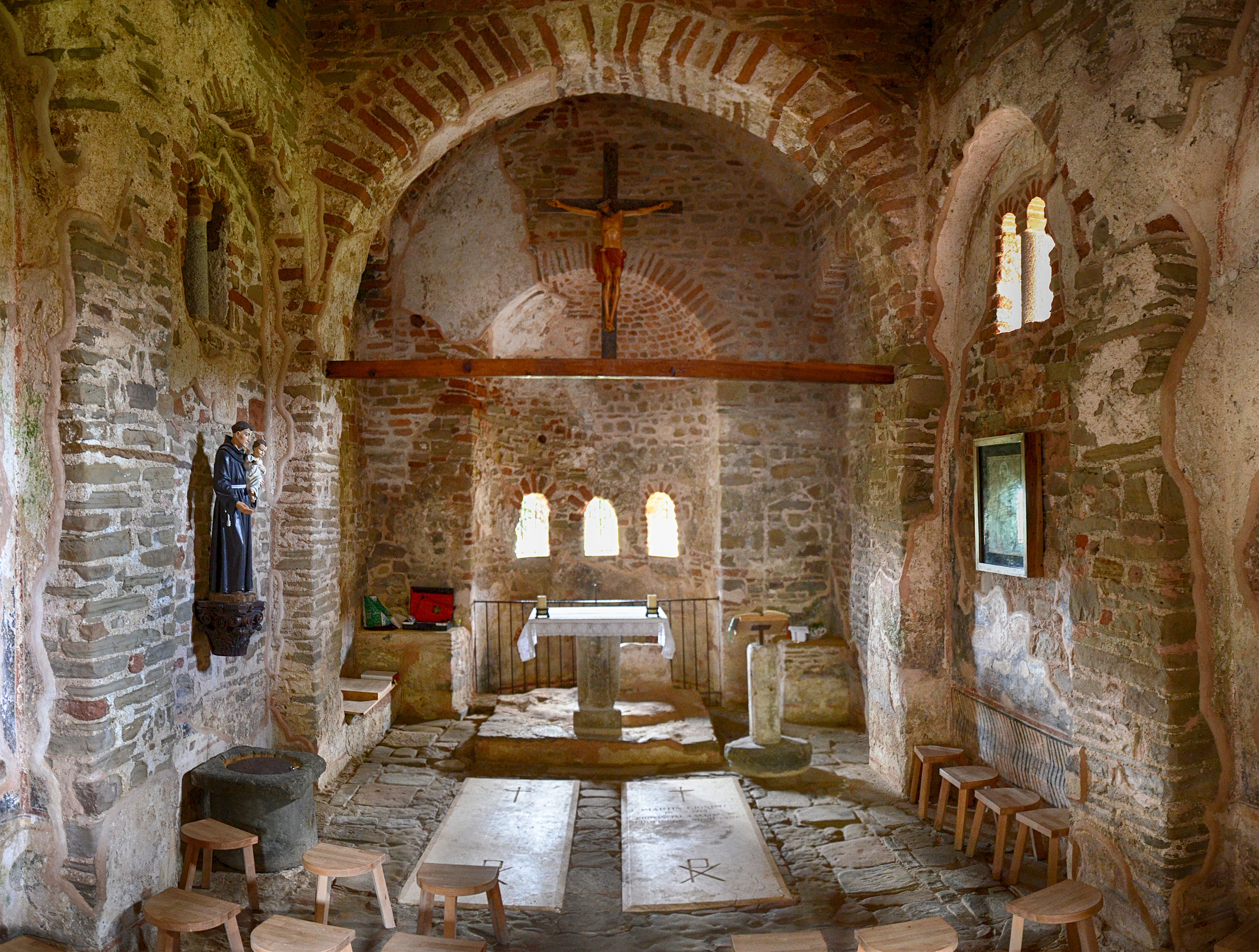
Inside view.Graves of Andrea Muzaka and his wife can be seen on the floor of the church.

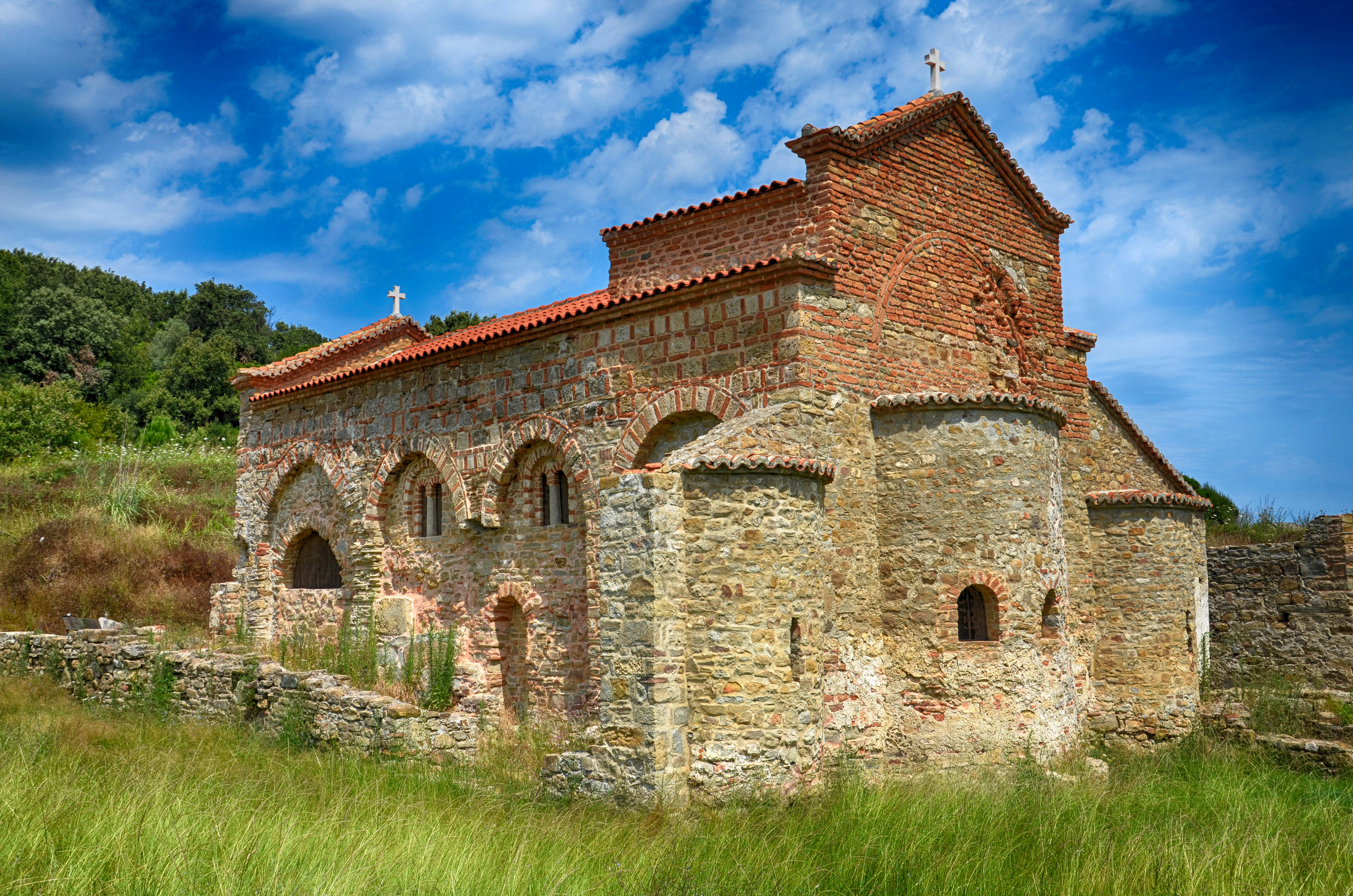

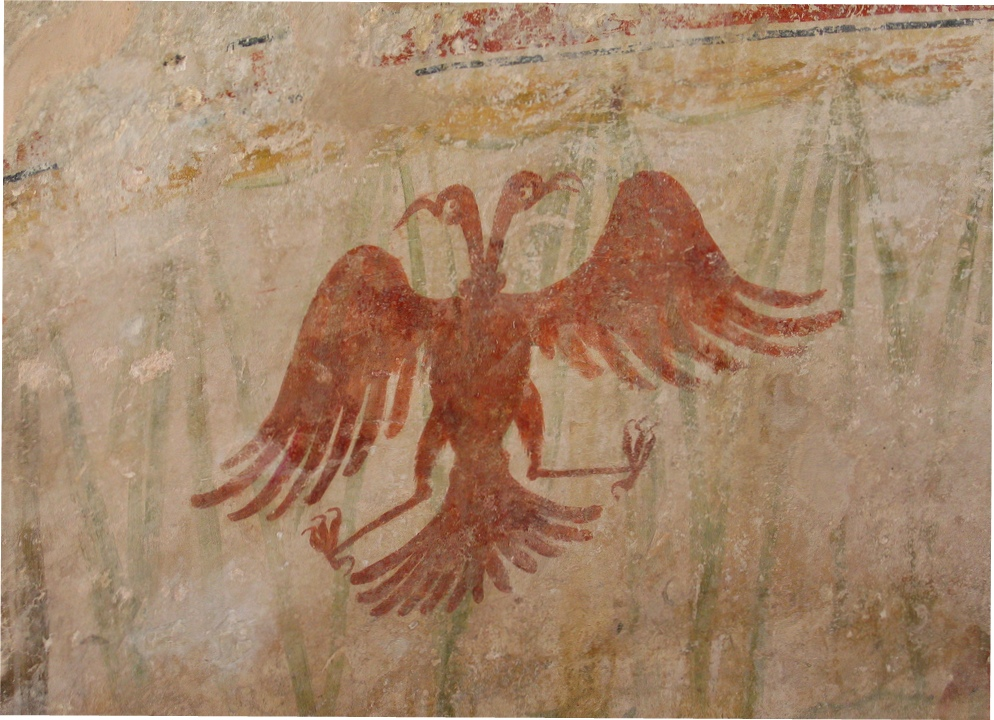
The Albanian double headed eagle painted in the walls during the medieval times.

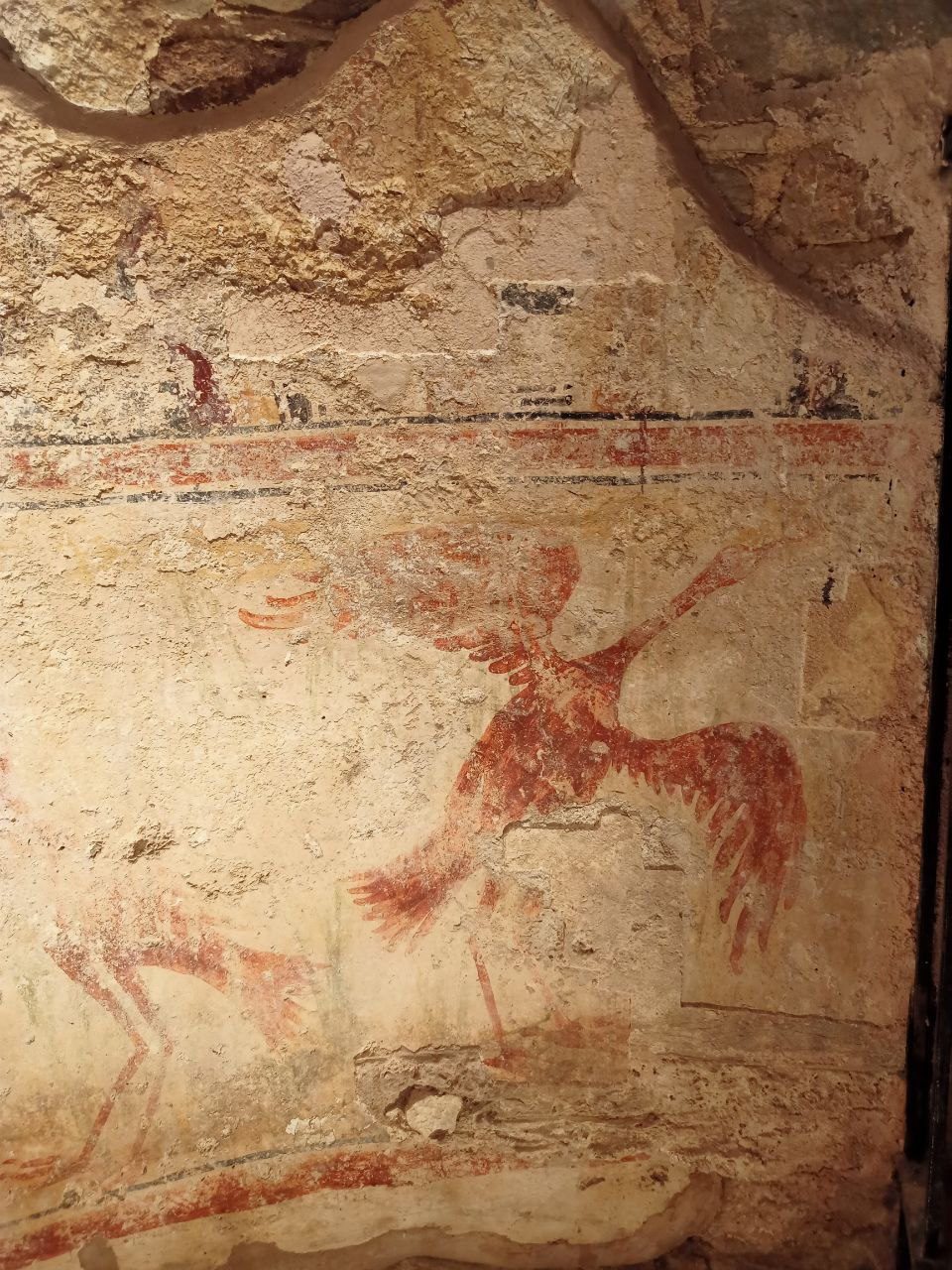

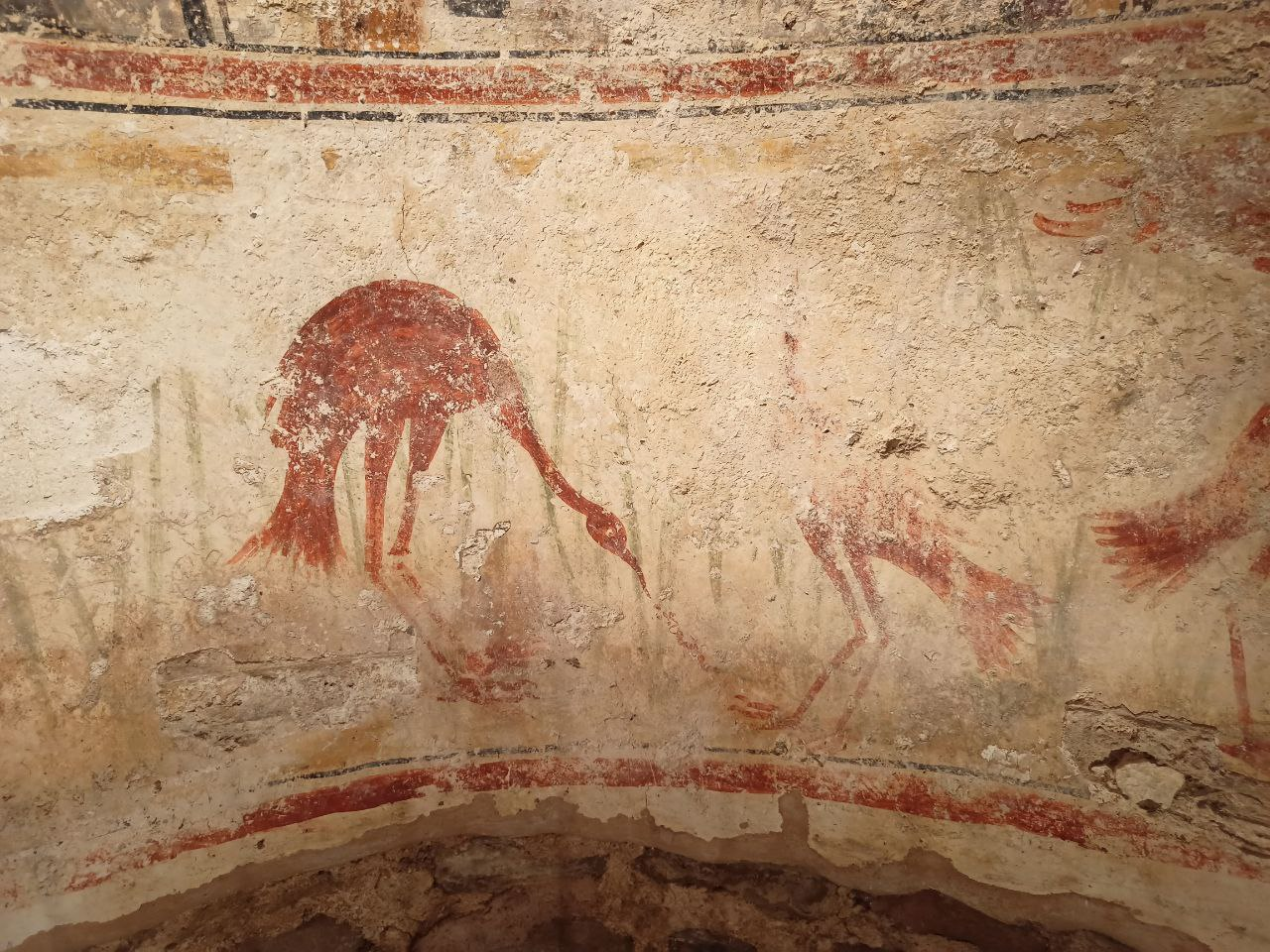

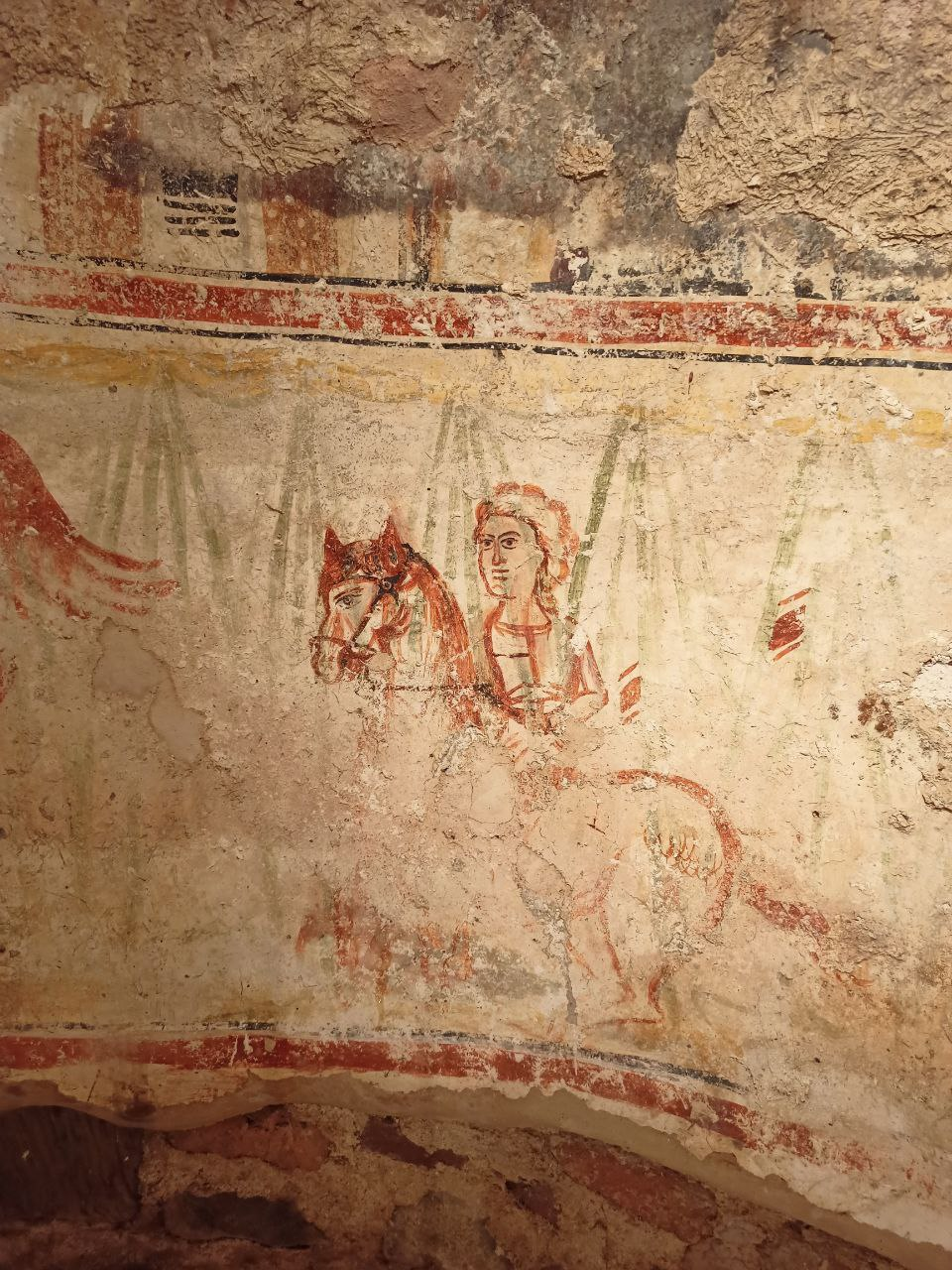

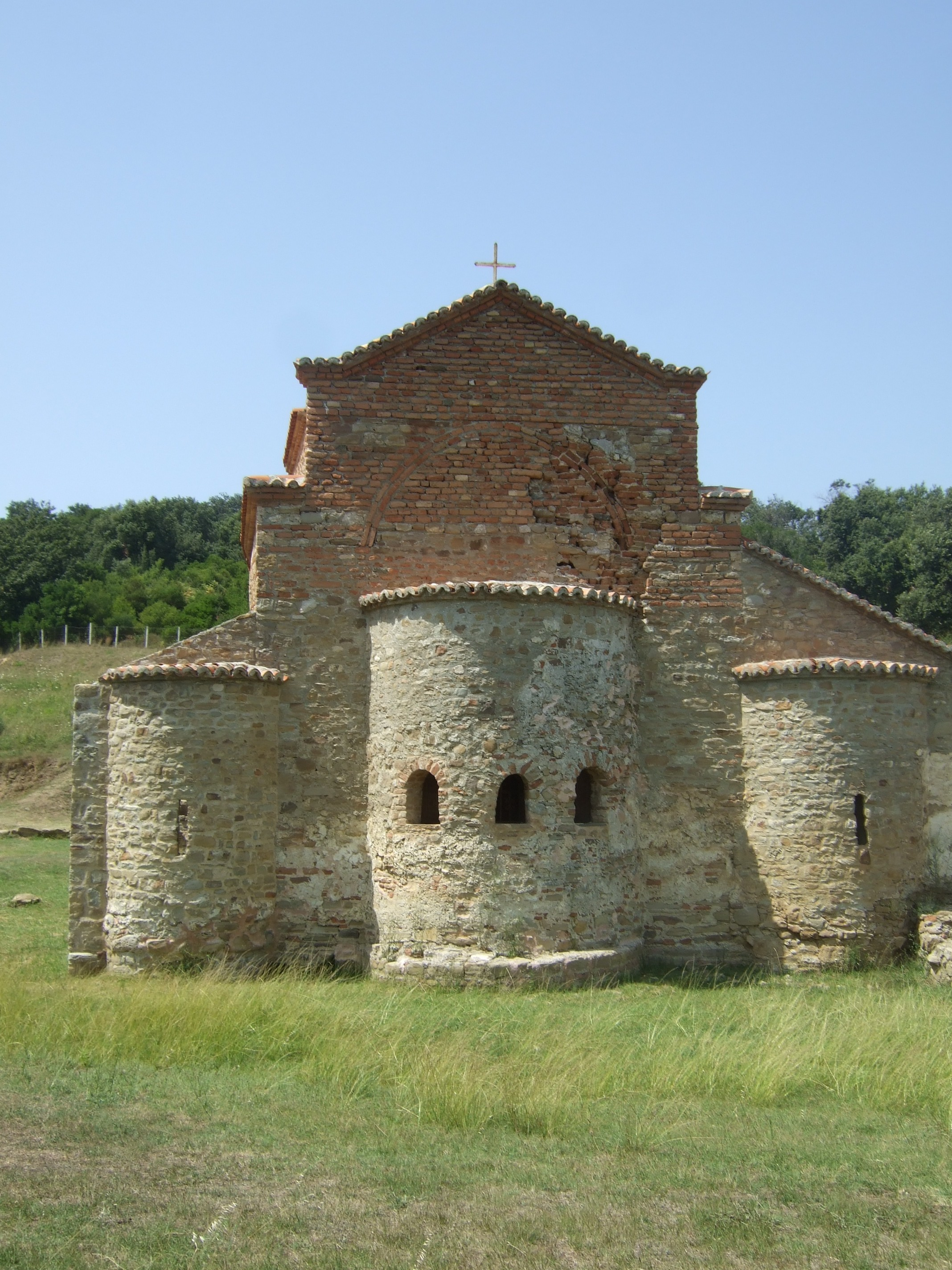

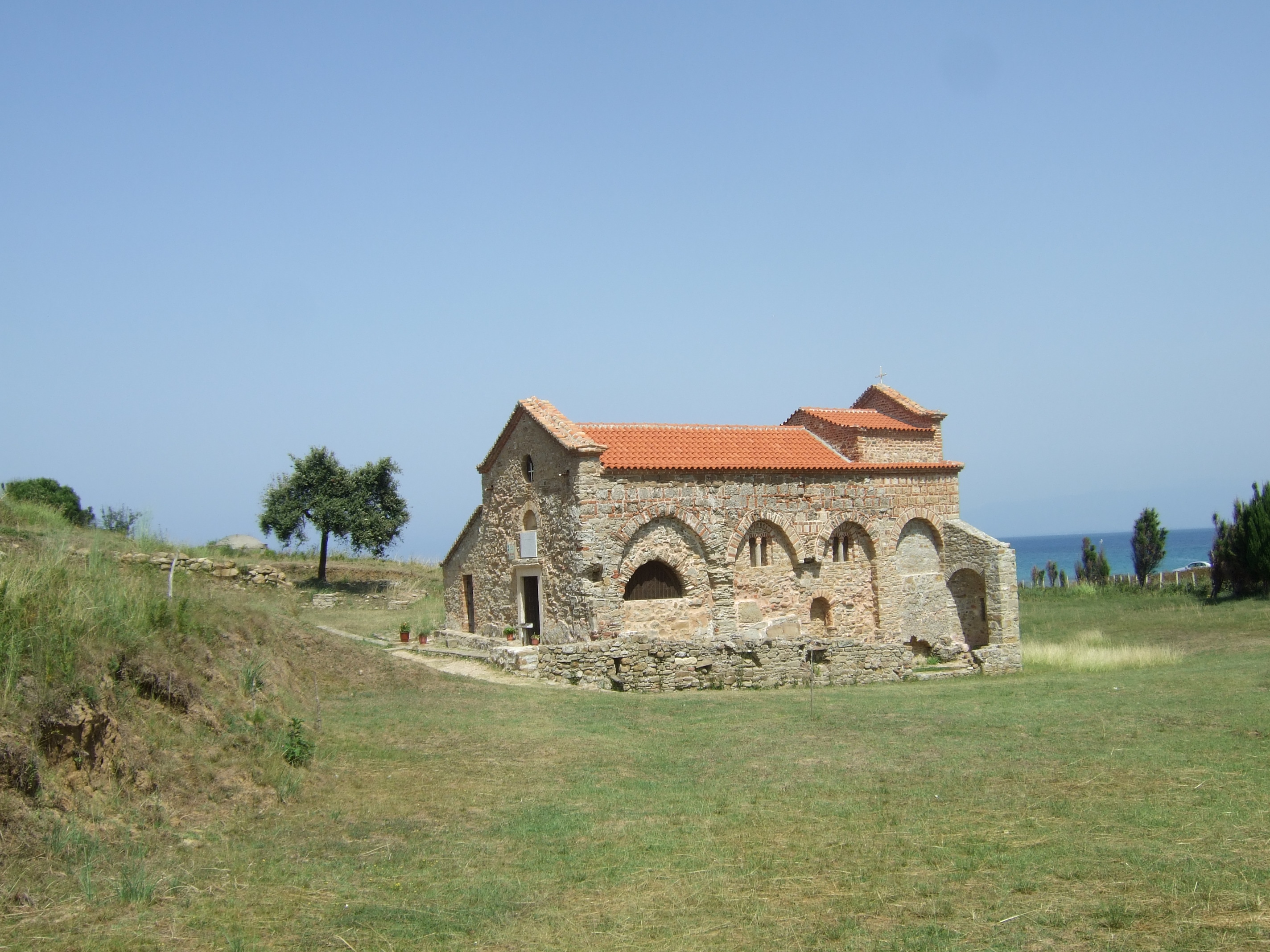
