= VISAR =

VISAR may refer to:

Acronyms

- Velocity interferometer system for any reflector, a velocity measurement system
- Video Image Stabilization and Registration, a NASA spinoff technology
- VISAR, a fictional computer system in James P. Hogan's Giants series

Other uses

- Visar (name), an Albanian masculine given name
