= Turbulent diffusion =

Fluid transport regime by random walk

Turbulent diffusion is the transport of mass, heat, or momentum within a system due to random and chaotic time dependent motions. It occurs when turbulent fluid systems reach critical conditions in response to shear flow, which results from a combination of steep concentration gradients, density gradients, and high velocities. It occurs much more rapidly than molecular diffusion and is therefore extremely important for problems concerning mixing and transport in systems dealing with combustion, contaminants, dissolved oxygen, and solutions in industry. In these fields, turbulent diffusion acts as an excellent process for quickly reducing the concentrations of a species in a fluid or environment, in cases where this is needed for rapid mixing during processing, or rapid pollutant or contaminant reduction for safety.

However, it has been extremely difficult to develop a concrete and fully functional model that can be applied to the diffusion of a species in all turbulent systems due to the inability to characterize both an instantaneous and predicted fluid velocity simultaneously. In turbulent flow, this is a result of several characteristics such as unpredictability, rapid diffusivity, high levels of fluctuating vorticity, and dissipation of kinetic energy.

== Applications ==
=== Atmospheric diffusion and pollutants ===
Atmospheric dispersion, or diffusion, studies how pollutants are mixed in the environment. There are many factors included in this modeling process, such as which level of atmosphere(s) the mixing is taking place, the stability of the environment and what type of contaminant and source is being mixed. The Eulerian and Lagrangian (discussed below) models have both been used to simulate atmospheric diffusion, and are important for a proper understanding of how pollutants react and mix in different environments. Both of these models take into account both vertical and horizontal wind, but additionally integrate Fickian diffusion theory to account for turbulence. While these methods have to use ideal conditions and make numerous assumptions, at this point in time, it is difficult to better calculate the effects of turbulent diffusion on pollutants. Fickian diffusion theory and further advancements in research on atmospheric diffusion can be applied to model the effects that current emission rates of pollutants from various sources have on the atmosphere.

=== Turbulent diffusion flames ===
Using planar laser-induced fluorescence (PLIF) and particle image velocimetry (PIV) processes, there has been on-going research on the effects of turbulent diffusion in flames. Main areas of study include combustion systems in gas burners used for power generation and chemical reactions in jet diffusion flames involving methane (CH_{4}), hydrogen (H_{2}) and nitrogen (N_{2}). Additionally, double-pulse Rayleigh temperature imaging has been used to correlate extinction and ignition sites with changes in temperature and the mixing of chemicals in flames.

== Modeling ==
=== Eulerian approach ===
The Eulerian approach to turbulent diffusion focuses on an infinitesimal volume at a specific space and time in a fixed frame of reference, at which physical properties such as mass, momentum, and temperature are measured. The model is useful because Eulerian statistics are consistently measurable and offer great application to chemical reactions. Similarly to molecular models, it must satisfy the same principles as the continuity equation below (where the advection of an element or species is balanced by its diffusion, generation by reaction, and addition from other sources or points) and the Navier–Stokes equations:

${\partial c_i\over\partial t}+{\partial\over\partial x_j}(u_j c_i) = D_i{\partial^2 c_i\over\partial x_j\partial x_j}+R_i(c_1,...,c_N,T)+ S_i(x,t)$

${i=1,2,...,N}$

where $c_i$ = species concentration of interest, $u_j$ = velocity t= time, $x_j$= direction, $D_i$ = molecular diffusion constant, $R_i$ = rate of $c_i$ generated reaction, $S_i$ = rate of $c_i$ generated by source. Note that $c_i$ is concentration per unit volume, and is not mixing ratio ($kg/kg$) in a background fluid.

If we consider an inert species (no reaction) with no sources and assume molecular diffusion to be negligible, only the advection terms on the left hand side of the equation survive. The solution to this model seems trivial at first, however we have ignored the random component of the velocity plus the average velocity in u_{j}= ū + u_{j}’ that is typically associated with turbulent behavior. In turn, the concentration solution for the Eulerian model must also have a random component c_{j}= c̅+ c_{j}’. This results in a closure problem of infinite variables and equations and makes it impossible to solve for a definite c_{i} on the assumptions stated.

Fortunately there exists a closure approximation in introducing the concept of eddy diffusivity and its statistical approximations for the random concentration and velocity components from turbulent mixing:

$\langle u_j 'c'\rangle = -K_{jj}{\partial (c)\over\partial x_j}$

where K_{jj} is the eddy diffusivity.

Substituting into the first continuity equation and ignoring reactions, sources, and molecular diffusion results in the following differential equation considering only the turbulent diffusion approximation in eddy diffusion:

${\partial c_i\over\partial t}+\overline{u}_j{\partial(c)\over\partial x_j} = {\partial\over\partial x_j}\bigg(K_{jj}{\partial (c)\over\partial x_j}\bigg)$

Unlike the molecular diffusion constant D, the eddy diffusivity is a matrix expression that may vary in space, and thus may not be taken outside the outer derivative.

=== Lagrangian approach ===
The Lagrangian model to turbulent diffusion uses a moving frame of reference to follow the trajectories and displacements of the species as they move and follows the statistics of each particle individually. Initially, the particle sits at a location x’ (x_{1}, x_{2}, x_{3}) at time t’. The motion of the particle is described by its probability of existing in a specific volume element at time t, that is described by Ψ(x_{1}, x_{2}, x_{3}, t) dx_{1} dx_{2} dx_{3} = Ψ(x,t)dx which follows the probability density function (pdf) such that:

$\boldsymbol{\psi}(\mathbf{x},\mathit{t}) = \int_{-\infty}^{\infty}\int_{-\infty}^{\infty}\int_{-\infty}^{\infty} \mathit{Q}(\mathbf{x},\mathit{t}|\mathbf{x}',\mathit{t}')\boldsymbol{\psi}(\mathbf{x}',\mathit{t}') d\mathbf{x}'$ Where function Q is the probably density for particle transition.

The concentration of particles at a location x and time t can then be calculated by summing the probabilities of the number of particles observed as follows:

$\langle c(\mathbf{x},\mathit{t})\rangle = \sum_{i=1}^{m}\boldsymbol{\psi}_i(\mathbf{x},\mathit{t})$

Which is then evaluated by returning to the pdf integral

$\langle c(\mathbf{x},\mathit{t})\rangle = = \int_{-\infty}^{\infty}\int_{-\infty}^{\infty}\int_{-\infty}^{\infty} \mathit{Q}(\mathbf{x},\mathit{t}|\mathbf{x}_0,\mathit{t}_0)\langle c(\mathbf{x}_0,\mathit{t}_0)\rangle d\mathbf{x}_0 + \int_{-\infty}^{\infty}\int_{-\infty}^{\infty}\int_{-\infty}^{\infty}\int_{t_0}^{t}\mathit{Q}(\mathbf{x},\mathit{t}|\mathbf{x}',\mathit{t}')\mathit{S}(\mathbf{x}',\mathit{t}') d\mathit{t}d\mathbf{x}'$

Thus, this approach is used to evaluate the position and velocity of particles relative to their neighbors and environment, and approximates the random concentrations and velocities associated with turbulent diffusion in the statistics of their motion.

=== Solutions ===
The resulting solution for solving the final equations listed above for both the Eulerian and Lagrangian models for analyzing the statistics of species in turbulent flow, both result in very similar expressions for calculating the average concentration at a location from a continuous source. Both solutions develop a Gaussian Plume and are virtually identical under the assumption that the variances in the x,y,z directions are related to the eddy diffusivity:

$\langle c(x,y,z)\rangle = \frac{q}{2\pi\sigma_y\sigma_z}\exp\bigg[-\bigg(\frac{y^2}{\sigma_y^2}+\frac{z^2}{\sigma_z^2}\bigg)\bigg]$

where $\sigma_y^2=\frac{2K_{yy}x}{\overline{u}} \sigma_z^2=\frac{2K_{zz}x}{\overline{u}}$

q= species emission rate, u = wind speed, σ_{i}^{2} = variance in i direction.

Under various external conditions such as directional flow speed (wind) and environmental conditions, the variances and diffusivities of turbulent diffusion are measured and used to calculate a good estimate of concentrations at a specific point from a source. This model is very useful in atmospheric sciences, especially when dealing with concentrations of contaminants in air pollution that emanate from sources such as combustion stacks, rivers, or strings of automobiles on a road.

== Future research ==
Because applying mathematical equations to turbulent flow and diffusion is so difficult, research in this area has been lacking until recently. In the past, laboratory efforts have used data from steady flow in streams or from fluids, that have a high Reynolds number, flowing through pipes, but it is difficult to obtain accurate data from these methods. This is because these methods involve ideal flow, which cannot simulate the conditions of turbulent flow necessary for developing turbulent diffusion models. With the advancement in computer-aided modeling and programming, scientists have been able to simulate turbulent flow in order to better understand turbulent diffusion in the atmosphere and in fluids.

Currently in use on research efforts are two main non-intrusive applications. The first is planar laser-induced fluorescence (PLIF), which is used to detect instantaneous concentrations at up to one million points per second. This technology can be paired with particle image velocimetry (PIV), which detects instantaneous velocity data. In addition to finding concentration and velocity data, these techniques can be used to deduce spatial correlations and changes in the environment. As technology and computer abilities are rapidly expanding, these methods will also improve greatly, and will more than likely be at the forefront of future research on modeling turbulent diffusion.

Aside from these efforts, there also have been advances in fieldwork used before computers were available. Real-time monitoring of turbulence, velocity and currents for fluid mixing is now possible. This research has proved important for studying the mixing cycles of contaminants in turbulent flows, especially for drinking water supplies.

As researching techniques and availability increase, many new areas are showing interest in utilizing these methods. Studying how robotics or computers can detect odor and contaminants in a turbulent flow is one area that will likely produce a lot of interest in research. These studies could help the advancement of recent research on placing sensors in aircraft cabins to effectively detect biological weapons and/or viruses.

== See also ==
- Turbulence
- Atmospheric dispersion modeling
- Air pollution dispersion terminology
- List of atmospheric dispersion models
- Fundamentals of Stack Gas Dispersion
- Diffusion flame
- Fick's laws of diffusion
- Planar laser-induced fluorescence
- Particle image velocimetry
- False diffusion
