= OTV =

OTV may refer to:

- Odor threshold value, a measure of odor intensity
- Orbital Test Vehicle, another name for the Boeing X-37 uncrewed spacecraft
- Orbital transfer vehicle, a space tug used to move a spacecraft from one orbit to another
- Outer Tactical Vest, a part of the Interceptor Body Armor system
- Overlay transport virtualization, a computer networking protocol
- Ozone tagging velocimetry, a modified hydroxyl tagging velocimetry

== TV networks, channels, stations and companies ==
- OfflineTV, an American online media collective based in Los Angeles, California
- OTV (Romanian TV channel), a defunct television station in Bucharest, Romania
- Okinawa Television, a television station in Okinawa Prefecture, Japan
- Osaka Television, the predecessor of ABC Television, a television station in Osaka Prefecture, Japan
- OTV (Egyptian TV channel) (2007–2011), a former television station in Egypt
- Odisha TV, TV stations owned by Ortel Communications Ltd., Bhubaneswar, Odisha
- OTV (Lebanon), a Lebanese television station
- Otvorena televizija, former name of Jabuka TV, a TV station in Zagreb, Croatia
- Oceania Television Network, a Palauan TV channel

== Other ==
- Omnium de Traitement et de Valorisation, a subsidiary of Veolia Environnement
- One True Voice, a British boyband
