= Particle tracking velocimetry =

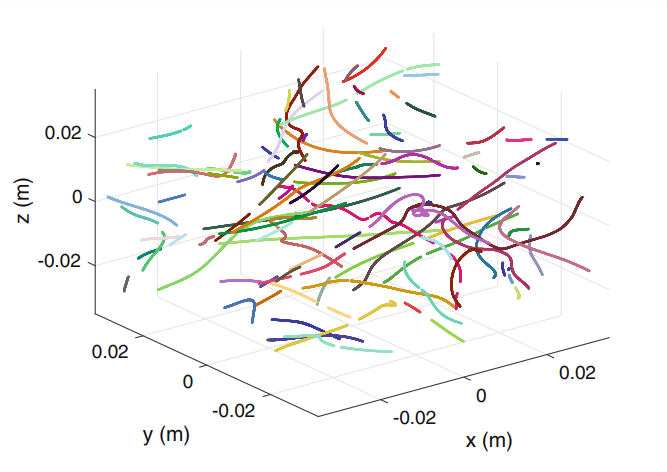
Particle tracking velocimetry.png

Particle tracking velocimetry (PTV) is a velocimetry method i.e. a technique to measure velocities and trajectories of moving objects. In fluid mechanics research these objects are neutrally buoyant particles that are suspended in fluid flow. As the name suggests, individual particles are tracked, so this technique is a Lagrangian approach, in contrast to particle image velocimetry (PIV), which is an Eulerian method that measures the velocity of the fluid as it passes the observation point, that is fixed in space. There are two experimental PTV methods:

- the two-dimensional (2-D) PTV. Measurements are made in a 2-D slice, illuminated by a thin laser sheet (a thin plane); a low density of seeded particles allows for tracking each of them individually for several frames.
- the three-dimensional particle tracking velocimetry (3-D PTV) is a distinctive experimental technique originally developed to study fully turbulent flows. It is now being used widely in various disciplines, ranging from structural mechanics research to medicine and industrial environments. It is based on a multiple camera-system in a stereoscopic arrangement, three-dimensional illumination of an observation volume, recording of the time sequence of stereoscopic images of optical targets (flow tracers illuminated particles), determining their instantaneous 3-D position in space by use of photogrammetric techniques and tracking their movement in time, thus obtaining a set of 3-D trajectories of the optical targets. Time-resolved three-dimensional particle tracking velocimetry is known as 4D-PTV.

== Description ==
The 3-D particle tracking velocimetry (PTV) belongs to the class of whole-field velocimetry techniques used in the study of turbulent flows, allowing the determination of instantaneous velocity and vorticity distributions over two or three spatial dimensions. 3-D PTV yields a time series of instantaneous 3-component velocity vectors in the form of fluid element trajectories. At any instant, the data density can easily exceed 10 velocity vectors per cubic centimeter. The method is based on stereoscopic imaging (using 2 to 4 cameras) and synchronous recording of the motion of flow tracers, i.e. small particles suspended in the flow, illuminated by a strobed light source. The 3-D particle coordinates as a function of time are then derived by use of image and photogrammetric analysis of each stereoscopic set of frames. The 3-D particle positions are tracked in the time domain to derive the particle trajectories. The ability to follow (track) a spatially dense set of individual particles for a sufficiently long period of time, and to perform statistical analysis of their properties, permits a Lagrangian description of the turbulent flow process. This is a unique advantage of the 3-D PTV method.

A typical implementation of the 3D-PTV consists of two, three or four digital cameras, installed in an angular configuration and synchronously recording the diffracted or fluorescent light from the flow tracers seeded in the flow. The flow is illuminated by a collimated laser beam, or by another source of light that is often strobed, synchronously with the camera frame rate, to reduce the effective exposure time of the moving optical targets and "freeze" their position on each frame. There is no restriction on the light to be coherent or monochromatic; only its illuminance has to be sufficient for imaging the tracer particles in the observational volume. Particles or tracers could be fluorescent, diffractive, tracked through as many consecutive frames as possible, and on as many cameras as possible to maximize positioning accuracy. In principle, two cameras in a stereoscopic configuration are sufficient in order to determine the three coordinates of a particle in space, but in most practical situations three or four cameras are used to reach a satisfactory 3-D positioning accuracy, as well as increase the trajectory yield when studying fully turbulent flows.

== 3D-PTV schemes ==
Several versions of 3D-PTV schemes exist. Most of these utilize either 3 CCDs or 4 CCDs.

== Real time image processing schemes ==
The use of white light for illuminating the observation volume, rather than laser-based illumination, substantially reduces both the cost, and the health and safety requirements. Initial development of the 3-D PTV method started as a joint project between the Institute of Geodesy and Photogrammetry and the Institute of Hydraulics of ETH Zurich. Further developments of the technique include real-time image processing using on-camera FPGA chip.

== See also ==
- Hot-wire anemometry
- Laser Doppler velocimetry
- Molecular tagging velocimetry
