= HTV News =

HTV News may refer to:

- The West Tonight, British news broadcast formerly called HTV News
- Wales at Six, Welsh news broadcast called HTV News from 1999 to 2004
- News bulletins on HTV Group stations in Wales and the West of England
- Croatian_Radiotelevision#Television (Croatian: Hrvatska televizija)

== See also ==
- HTV (disambiguation)
