= Seeding (fluid dynamics) =

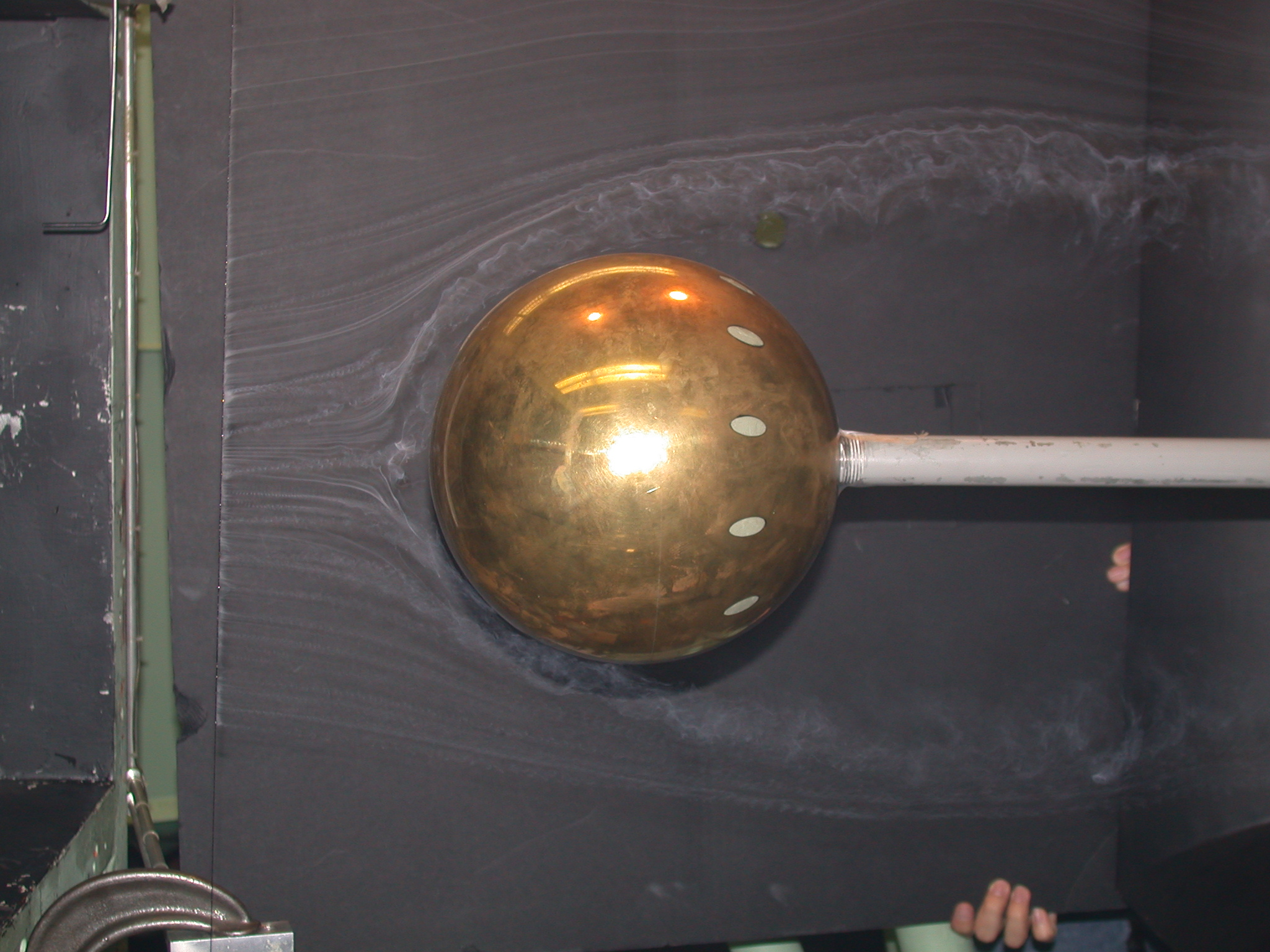
Flow around a sphere being visualized by seeding the flow with smoke.

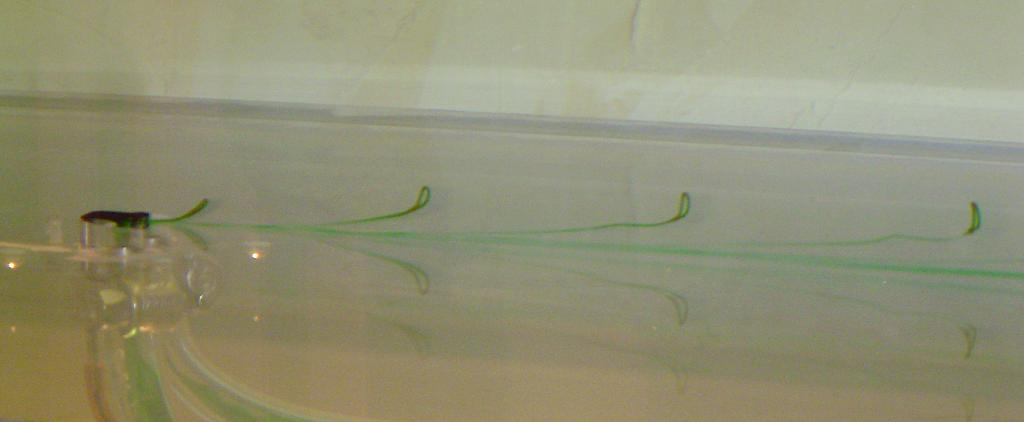
Visualization of hairpin vortex structure, made visible by seeding the flow with colored dye.

Seeding is a fundamental technique in fluid dynamics. It is used to visualize and measure fluid flow. Researchers introduce small particles, called seed particles, into a fluid. These particles move with the fluid. This allows researchers to observe and analyze the fluid's movement under different conditions.

The significance of seeding is its ability to provide insights into complex fluid behaviors. These behaviors are otherwise invisible to the naked eye. Techniques like Particle Image Velocimetry (PIV) and Laser Doppler Velocimetry (LDV) rely on seeding to obtain accurate data. Seeding is an indispensable tool in experimental fluid mechanics. It enables precise measurements and detailed visualizations. This drives advancements in science and engineering, such as investigating airflow over aircraft wings, analyzing blood flow through arteries, and studying the dispersion of pollutants in the environment.

== Background ==
Seeding in fluid dynamics is the process of introducing small particles, called seed particles, into a fluid. This allows the visualization and measurement of the fluid's motion. The particles are chosen to closely follow the fluid's flow. They act as tracers, making the invisible flow patterns visible when illuminated by light sources, such as lasers. The movement of these particles can be captured and analyzed using various techniques. This provides insights into the velocity, turbulence, and other dynamic properties of the fluid.

The use of seeding techniques in fluid dynamics has a long history dating back to the early 20th century. Initially, researchers used simple methods like injecting dye or smoke into fluids to observe flow patterns. These early techniques provided a basic understanding of fluid behavior but lacked the precision needed for detailed analysis.

In the mid-20th century, the development of more sophisticated seeding techniques began with the advent of modern experimental methods like Particle Image Velocimetry (PIV) and Laser Doppler Velocimetry (LDV). PIV, developed in the 1980s, revolutionized fluid dynamics research by allowing for the detailed measurement of flow velocities across entire fields of view, rather than just single points. LDV, developed in the 1960s, provided a way to measure fluid velocity at precise points using laser beams and seed particles. These advancements marked a significant evolution in seeding techniques, enabling researchers to conduct more accurate and comprehensive studies of fluid dynamics.

== Seeding Techniques ==
=== Particle Image Velocimetry (PIV) ===
PIV is a technique. In this technique, seed particles are introduced into a fluid. The movement of these particles is captured by high-speed cameras. By analyzing the sequential images, the velocity of the fluid can be determined across the entire field of view. This method is widely used for studying complex flow patterns. These complex flow patterns are found in various applications, such as aerodynamics and biomedical research.

=== Laser Doppler Velocimetry (LDV) ===
LDV uses laser beams that shine into a fluid. This fluid has particles in it. As the particles move through the intersection of the laser beams, they scatter light. This scattered light is then detected. This allows measuring the velocity of the fluid at precise points. LDV is very useful for getting accurate velocity measurements in turbulent or high-speed flows.

=== Flow Visualization ===
Flow visualization techniques use seeding to make fluid flows visible. These techniques include methods like dye injection, smoke seeding, or the use of reflective particles. These techniques help researchers observe and analyze flow patterns, vortices, and other fluid behaviors in both experimental and educational settings.

=== Particle Selection ===
The selection of seed particles is crucial for accurate measurements. The particles must be small enough to closely follow the fluid flow without affecting it, but large enough to be detected by imaging or laser systems. The density, size, and material of the particles are carefully chosen based on the fluid properties and the specific technique used.

== Applications ==
=== Aerospace Engineering ===
Seeding is important in aerospace engineering. It helps study airflow over aircraft wings and other aerodynamic surfaces. Researchers use seeding in wind tunnel tests to see and measure how air moves over wings, fuselages, and control surfaces. This information is essential for improving aircraft design. It helps increase lift, reduce drag, and enhance overall performance. Seeding techniques are also used in engine testing. They study airflow within jet engines. This helps engineers improve efficiency, increase thrust, and reduce emissions.

=== Biomedical Engineering ===
In biomedical engineering, seeding is used to study blood flow in arteries and airflow in the respiratory system. For example, in cardiovascular research, small particles are added to fluids that mimic blood to visualize and measure flow patterns within arteries, especially at locations where blockages or aneurysms may occur. This helps understand the hemodynamics involved in various cardiovascular diseases. Similarly, seeding techniques are used in respiratory studies to track airflow in the lungs and nasal passages, which assists in the design of medical devices like inhalers and the treatment of respiratory conditions.

=== Environmental Engineering ===
Seeding is essential in environmental engineering. It helps track the spread of pollutants in air or water. Researchers introduce seed particles or tracers into water or air. This allows them to study how pollutants spread over time. This information is crucial for modeling the impact of industrial discharges, oil spills, or air pollution. It also helps develop strategies to reduce environmental damage. Seeding techniques also help study natural processes. This includes the movement of sediments in rivers and the spread of nutrients in marine ecosystems.

=== Industrial Processes ===
In various industrial processes, seeding is used to optimize operations. For example, in chemical reactors, seeding can help visualize and measure the mixing of different reactants. This ensures uniformity and improves reaction efficiency. In combustion research, seeding particles are introduced into fuel-air mixtures. This is to study flame propagation and combustion efficiency. This is vital for improving the performance of engines and industrial burners.

== See also ==
- Flow visualization – Visualization technique in fluid dynamics
- Fluid dynamics – Aspects of fluid mechanics involving fluid flow
- Fluid mechanics – Branch of physics concerned with the mechanics of fluids (liquids, gases, and plasmas)
- Streamlines, streaklines, and pathlines – Field lines in a fluid flow
