= Velocimetry =

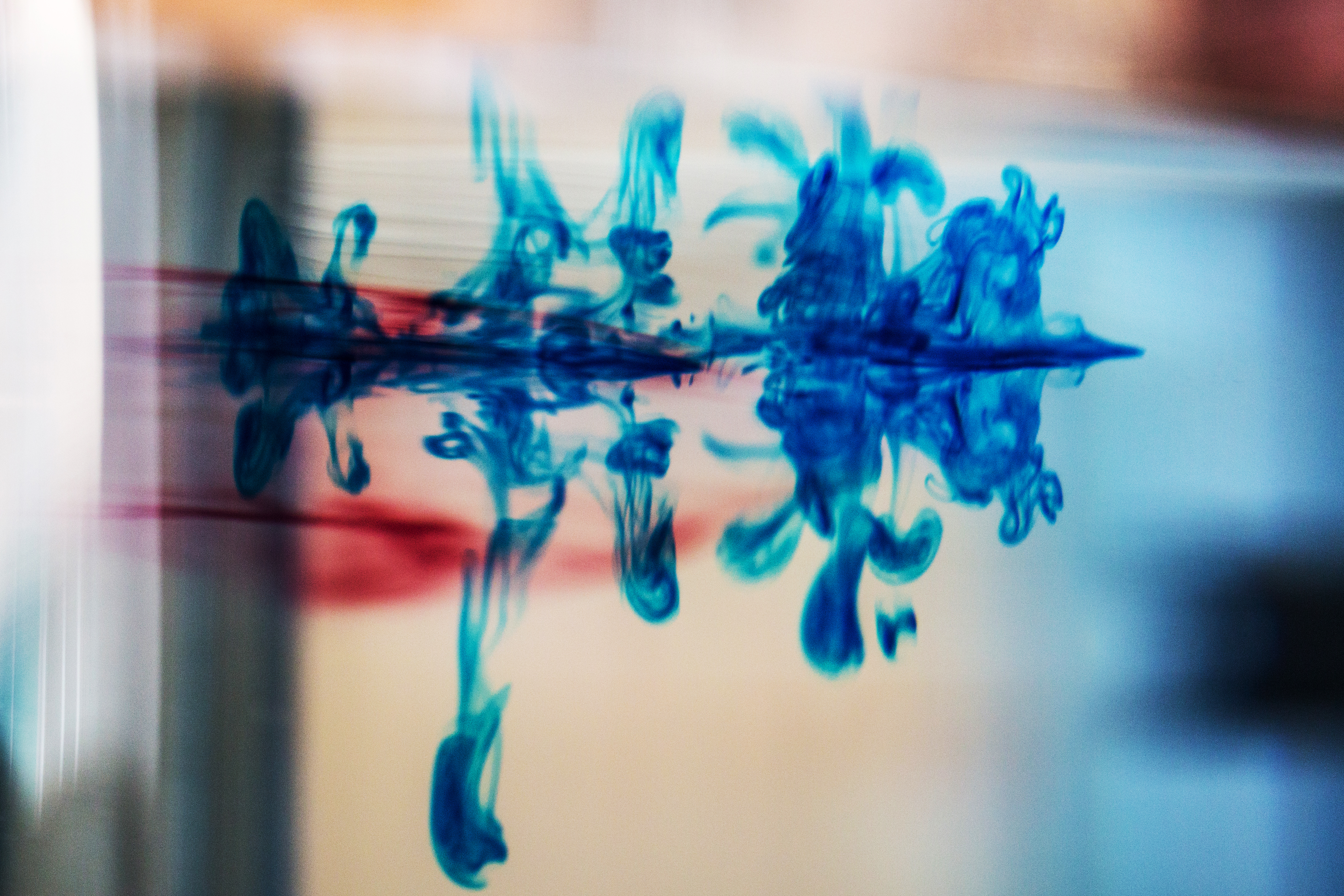
Dye in a fluid can help illuminate the fluids motion paths. This is the most simple example of Velocimetry.

Velocimetry is the measurement of the velocity of fluids. This is a task often taken for granted, and involves far more complex processes than one might expect. It is often used to solve fluid dynamics problems, study fluid networks, in industrial and process control applications, as well as in the creation of new kinds of fluid flow sensors. Methods of velocimetry include particle image velocimetry and particle tracking velocimetry, Molecular tagging velocimetry, laser-based interferometry, ultrasonic Doppler methods, Doppler sensors, and new signal processing methodologies.

In general, velocity measurements are made in the Lagrangian or Eulerian frames of reference (see Lagrangian and Eulerian coordinates). Lagrangian methods assign a velocity to a volume of fluid at a given time, whereas Eulerian methods assign a velocity to a volume of the measurement domain at a given time. A classic example of the distinction is particle tracking velocimetry, where the idea is to find the velocity of individual flow tracer particles (Lagrangian) and particle image velocimetry, where the objective is to find the average velocity within a sub-region of the field of view (Eulerian).

== History ==
Velocimetry can be traced back to the days of Leonardo da Vinci, who would float grass seeds on a flow and sketch the resulting trajectories of the seeds that he observed (a Lagrangian measurement). Eventually da Vinci's flow visualizations were used in his cardio vascular studies, attempting to learn more about blood flow throughout the human body.

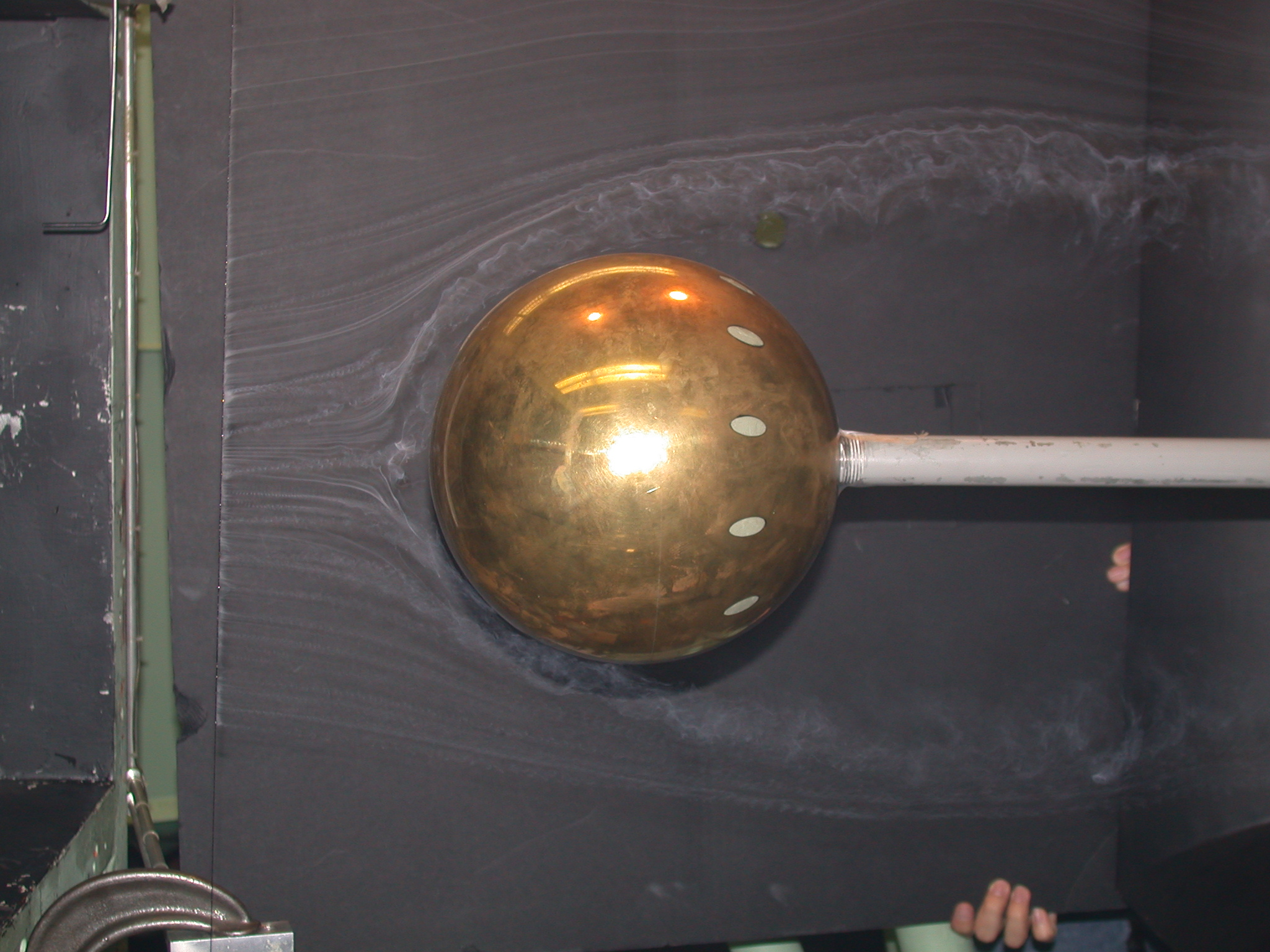
Smoke used as a visualizer similarly to the technique Marey popularized

Methods similar to da Vinci's were carried out for close to four hundred years due to technological limitations. One other notable study comes from Felix Savart in 1833. Using a stroboscopic instrument, he sketched water jet impacts.

In the late 19th century a huge breakthrough was made in these technologies when it became possible to take photographs of flow patterns. One notable instance of this is Ludwig Mach using particles unresolvable by the naked eye to visualize streamlines. Another notable contribution occurred in the 20th century by Étienne-Jules Marey who used photographic techniques to introduce the concept of the smoke box. This model allowed both for the directions of the flow to be tracked but also the speed, as streamlines closer together indicated faster flow.

More recently, high speed cameras and digital technology has revolutionized the field, allowing for the possibility of many more techniques and rendering of flow fields in three dimensions.

== Methods ==
Today the basic ideas established by Leonardo are the same; the flow must be seeded with particles that can be observed by the method of choice. The seeding particles depend on many factors including the fluid, the sensing method, the size of the measurement domain, and sometimes the expected accelerations in the flow. If the flow contains particles that can be measured naturally, seeding the flow is unnecessary.

Spatial reconstruction of fluid streamtubes using long exposure imaging of tracer can be applied for streamlines imaging velocimetry, high resolution frame rate free velocimetry of stationary flows. Temporal integration of velocimetric information can be used to totalize fluid flow. For measuring velocity and length on moving surfaces, laser surface velocimeters are used.

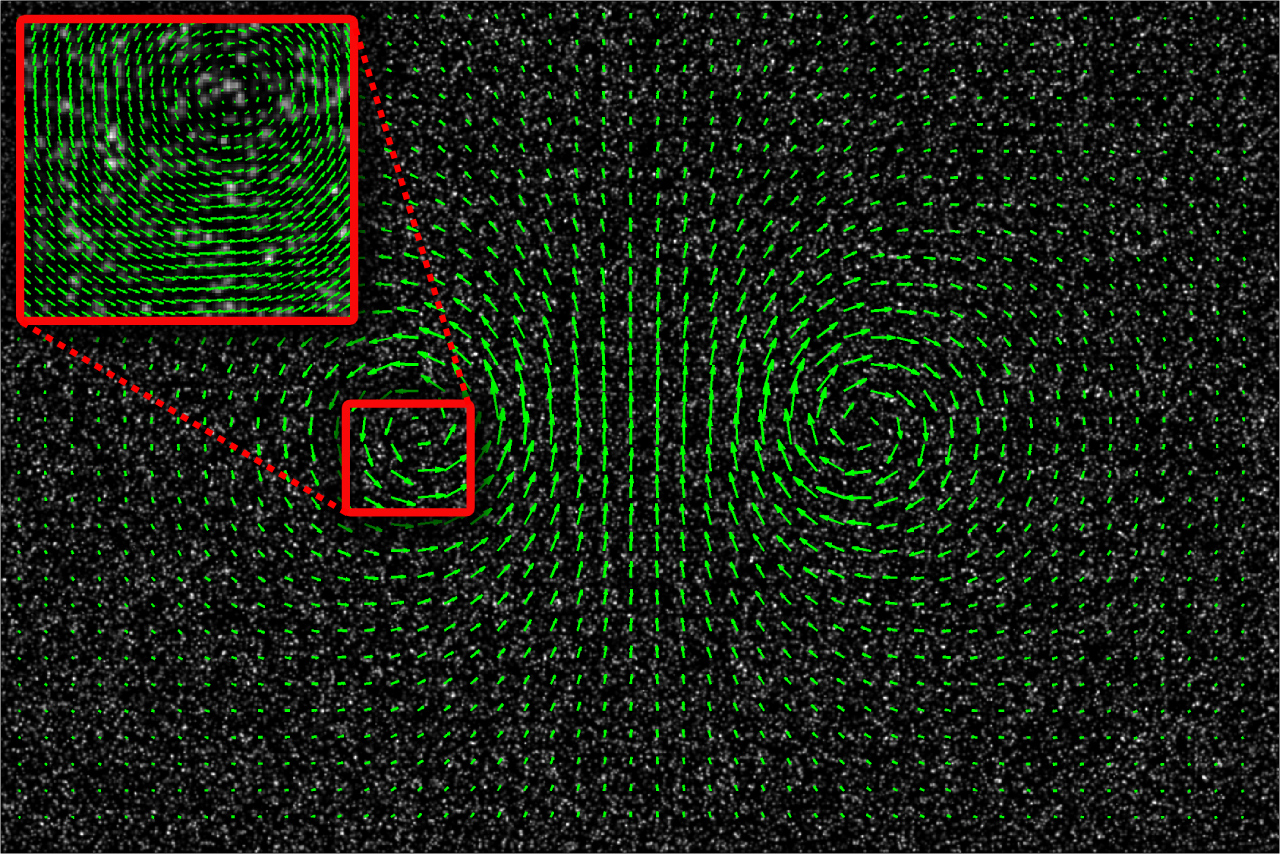
Vector field created by a PIV analysis of vortexes

The fluid generally limits the particle selection according to its specific gravity; the particles should ideally be of the same density as the fluid. This is especially important in flows with a high acceleration (for example, high-speed flow through a 90-degree pipe elbow). Heavier fluids like water and oil are thus very attractive to velocimetry, whereas air ads a challenge in most techniques that it is rarely possible to find particles of the same density as air.

Still, even large-field measurement techniques like PIV have been performed successfully in air. Particles used for seeding can be both liquid droplets or solid particles. Solid particles being preferred when high particle concentrations are necessary. For point measurements like laser Doppler velocimetry, particles in the nanometre diameter range, such as those in cigarette smoke, are sufficient to perform a measurement.

In water and oil there are a variety of inexpensive industrial beads that can be used, such as silver-coated hollow glass spheres manufactured to be conductive powders (tens of micrometres diameter range) or other beads used as reflectors and texturing agents in paints and coatings. The particles need not be spherical; in many cases titanium dioxide particles can be used.

== Relevant Applications ==
PIV has been used in research for controlling aircraft noise. This noise is created by the high speed mixing of hot jet exhaust with the ambient temperature of the environment. PIV has been used to model this behavior.

Additionally, Doppler velocimetry enables noninvasive techniques of determining whether fetuses are the proper size at a given term of pregnancy.

== Basis for Four-Dimensional Pulmonary Imaging ==
Velocimetry has also been applied to medical images in order to obtain regional measurements of blood flow and tissue motion. Initially, standard PIV (single plane illumination) was adapted to work with x-ray images (full volume illumination), enabling the measurement of opaque flows such as blood flow. This was then extended to investigate the regional 2D motion of lung tissue, and was found to be a sensitive indicator of regional lung disease.

Velocimetry was also expanded to 3D regional measurements blood flow and tissue motion with a new technique – computed tomographic x-ray velocimetry – which uses information contained within the PIV cross-correlation to extract 3D measurements from 2D image sequences. Specifically, computed tomographic x-ray velocimetry generates a model solution, compares the cross-correlations of the model to the cross-correlation from the 2D image sequence, and iterates the model solution until the difference between the model cross-correlations and the image sequence cross-correlations are minimised. This technique is being used as a non invasive method to quantify functional performance of the lungs. It is being used in a clinical setting, and is being utilised in clinical trails conducted by institutions including Duke University, Vanderbilt University Medical Center and Oregon Health Science University
