= Photon Doppler velocimetry =

Photon Doppler velocimetry (PDV) is a one-dimensional Fourier transform analysis of a heterodyne laser interferometry, used in the shock physics community to measure velocities in dynamic experiments with high temporal precision. PDV was developed at Lawrence Livermore National Laboratory by Oliver Strand. In recent years PDV has achieved popularity in the shock physics community as an adjunct or replacement for velocity interferometer system for any reflector (VISAR), another time-resolved velocity interferometry system. Modern data acquisition technology and off-the-shelf optical telecommunications devices now enable the assembly of PDV systems within reasonable budgets.

== Theory ==
The fundamental mechanism of PDV is the interference pattern created by two electromagnetic waves with a small difference in frequency. Since most PDV systems are constructed with available telecommunications equipment, a standard laser source for a PDV system is centered at 1550 nm (or 193.4 THz). If this source is then reflected off of a moving surface with some velocity ($v$), the reflected light will be shifted in frequency ($\nu_\text{observed}$) according to the relativistic Doppler shift equation.

$$\nu_\text{observed} = \nu_\text{source} \sqrt{\frac{1+v/c}{1-v/c}}$$

If the shifted return light is then interfered with the original source, the resulting wave will have a beat frequency in the range of a few gigahertz. This beat frequency is slow enough that it can be monitored with a simple photodetector and high speed oscilloscope. By recording the beat frequency over time, a complete velocity history of the surface is obtained.

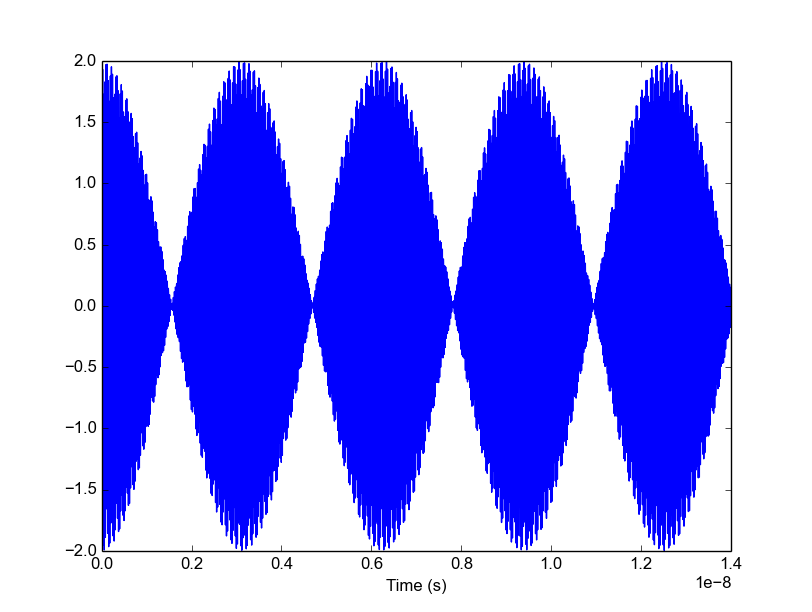
Beat frequency obtained from the interference of a 193.4 THz EM wave with a 193.40032 THz EM wave. The shifted frequency corresponds to a surface moving toward the observer at a velocity of 500 m/s.

== Data analysis ==
In theory, the analysis of a PDV data signal is quite simple, where the apparent velocity of the moving surface ($v^*$) is simply a function of the source wavelength ($\lambda_0$) and the signal frequency ($\bar{f}$):

$$v^* = \frac{\lambda_0}{2} \bar{f}$$

In practice, however, determining the instantaneous frequency ($\bar{f}$) of the signal by inspection can be inaccurate and inefficient. Consequently, Fourier transform analysis is used to extract the most probable frequency components, which can then be used to calculate the velocity history.

By taking sequential FFTs over a time window that moves across the data signal, a 2D spectrogram can be created which indicates the frequency components most dominant in the data. The velocity history can then be extracted from the spectrogram.

== Advantages ==
PDV can measure a wide range of velocities (limited primarily by the time resolution of the signal recording equipment), and is relatively easy to set up and use.

== Limitations ==
Depending on the quality of the data signal and parameters of the FFT, the inherent error in PDV measurements can be high. However, there are ways to mitigate these problems and obtain velocity histories with very high accuracy.

== Conferences ==
The 2009 PDV users conference was held at the University of Texas at Austin, Institute for Advanced Technology. The 2010 PDV users conference was held at the Ohio State University.

== See also ==
- Laser Doppler velocimetry
- Velocity interferometer system for any reflector (VISAR)
