= HTV =

HTV may refer to:

== Aerospace ==
- Huntsville Regional Airport in Huntsville, Texas, United States
- H-II Transfer Vehicle, a Japanese cargo spacecraft for the International Space Station
- Hypersonic Technology Vehicle, part of DARPA Falcon Project

== Television ==
- Hearst Television, US
- Hellenic TV, a British Greek-language station
- Hiroshima Telecasting, a television station in Hiroshima Prefecture, Japan
- HTV (Latin America), a Latin American channel
- Ho Chi Minh City Television, a Vietnamese media company
- Hrvatska televizija, the Croatian state broadcaster
- HTV Mostar, a former Croatian-language channel in Bosnia and Herzegovina
- ITV Wales & West, formerly Harlech Television or HTV
- Helsinki Televisio, a cable television company in Helsinki, Finland

== Other uses ==
- Commerce and Transport Union, a former Austrian trade union
- Heat transfer vinyl
- Hydroxyl tagging velocimetry
