= Planar laser-induced fluorescence =

Optical diagnostic technique

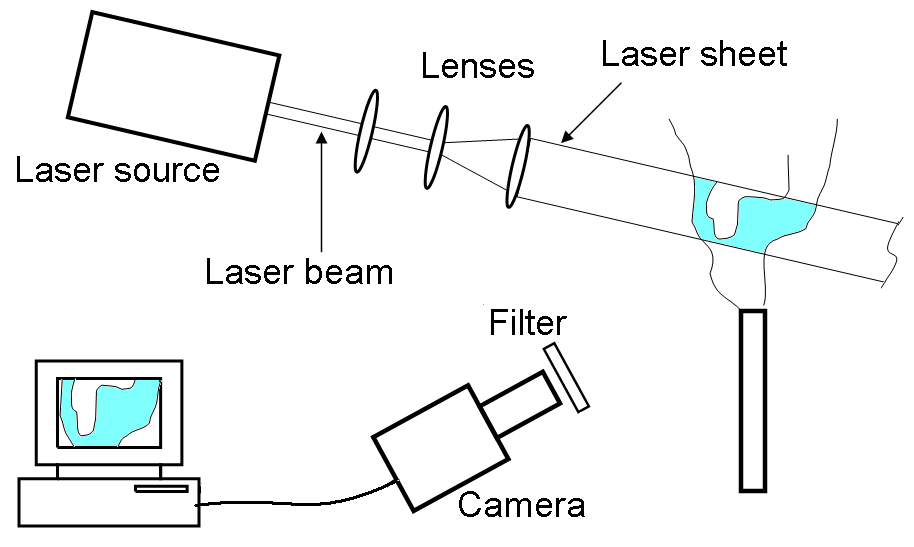
A simplified PLIF experimental facility.

Planar laser-induced fluorescence (PLIF) is an optical diagnostic technique widely used for flow visualization and quantitative measurements. PLIF has been shown to be used for velocity, concentration, temperature and pressure measurements.

== Working ==
A PLIF setup consists of a source of light (usually a laser), an arrangement of lenses to form a sheet, fluorescent medium, collection optics and a detector. The light from the source, illuminates the medium, which then fluoresces. This signal is captured by the detector and can be related to the various properties of the medium.

The typical lasers used as light sources are pulsed, which provide a higher peak power than the continuous-wave lasers. Also the short pulse time is useful for good temporal resolution. Some of the widely used laser sources are Nd:YAG laser, dye lasers, excimer lasers, and ion lasers. The light from the laser (usually a beam) is passed through a set of lenses and/or mirrors to form a sheet, which is then used to illuminate the medium. This medium is either made up of fluorescent material or can be seeded with a fluorescent substance. The signal is usually captured by a CCD or CMOS camera (sometimes intensified cameras are also used). Timing electronics are often used to synchronize pulsed light sources with intensified cameras.

== Comparison with other techniques ==
=== Advantages ===
Unlike several other flow imaging techniques, PLIF may be combined with particle image velocimetry (PIV). This allows for the simultaneous measurement of a fluid velocity field and species concentration.

=== Limitations ===
1. flowfield must contain molecular species with an optical resonance wavelength that can be accessed by laser
2. temperature measurements typically require two laser sources
3. velocity measurements typically practical only for high Mach number flows (near sonic or supersonic)
4. signal-to-noise ratio often limited by detector shot-noise
5. fluorescence interferences from other species, especially from hydrocarbons in high pressure reacting flows
6. attenuation of laser sheet across flow field or reabsorption of fluorescence before it reaches detector can lead to systematic errors

== See also ==
- Fluorescence
- Laser-induced fluorescence
- Flow visualization
- Particle image velocimetry (PIV)
