= Visar (name) =

- Gender: Male

Origin
- Region of origin: Albania

Visar is an Albanian masculine given name. People with the name Visar include:

- Visar Arifaj (born 1987), Kosovar politician
- Visar Bekaj (born 1997), Kosovar footballer
- Visar Berisha (born 1986), Kosovan footballer
- Visar Dodani (1857-1939), Albanian journalist and activist
- Visar Kastrati (born 1986), Kosovan referee
- Visar Mulliqi (born 1966), Kosovar impressionist and expressionist painter
- Visar Musliu (born 1994), Macedonian footballer
- Visar Ymeri (born 1973), Kosovar-Albanian activist and politician
