= Visar Mulliqi =

Albanian painter

- Born: 2 May 1966 (age 60); Pristina, SFR Yugoslavia
- Writing career
- Notable works: Evolution (Exhibition in Tirana, 2012)

Visar Mulliqi (born 2 May 1966) is an impressionist and expressionist painter of Kosovo.

== Life ==
Influenced by his father, the famous artist Muslim Mulliqi, Visar Mulliqi studied Painting at the Faculty of Arts, University of Prishtina and graduated in 1990. He then continued the post-graduate studies and obtained a master's degree at the Faculty of Arts in 1997.

From 1990, Visar Mulliqi held 15 personal exhibitions in cities like Paris, Graz, Prishtina, Gjakova, Tirana, Gostivar, and Tetova and over 100 collective exhibitions in Austria, Japan, Belgium, Germany, Switzerland, Albania, and Kosovo.

One of his collective exhibition was held in 1999 at the Museum of Applied Arts, Vienna.

Currently, he is working as a Painting Professor at the Faculty of Arts, University of Prishtina, where he has contributed with his knowledge and skills since 1995.

Mulliqi's work is characterized by abstractness and use of color contrast that easily attracts attention. His paintings often transmit optimism, leaving the viewer intrigued by the structure, texture and the combination of color.

Recent exhibitions of Mulliqi include the one held in Paris, France (May 2016), along with a posthumous exhibition of Muslim Mulliqi. The exhibition was held in the premises of La Maison D'Albanie, with the patronage of FICEP Fédération internationale catholique d'éducation physique et sportive and the honoring of the Ambassador of the Republic of Kosovo in France, Muhamedin Kullashi.

Visar Mulliqi also participated in the jury panel on the 10th Anniversary "Muslim Mulliqi Prize" in 2014.

== Personal exhibitions ==
- Cafe Gallery Roma, Pristina (1995)
- Cafe Gallery Dodona, Pristina (1996 and 1997)
- Leechgasse Gallery, Graz (1998 and 1999)
- Cafe Gallery Hani i 2 Roberteve, Pristina (1998)
- Pallati i Rinise Gallery, Pristina (2001)
- "Vizioni+" Gallery, Gjakova (2002)
- Kosovo Museum, Pristina (2011)
- "Kult" Gallery, Gostivar (2012)
- Gallery of Art, Tetovo (2012)
- "FAB" Gallery, Tirana "EVOLUTION/EVOLUCIONI" (2012)
- Galerie Nicolas Deman, Paris (2015)
- La Maison d’Albanie, Paris (2016)
- Faculty of Arts Gallery, Pristina "100% ORIGINAL" (2018)
- Ministry of Culture's Gallery of Art "Qafa", Pristina "Origjinaliteti" (2019)
- National Gallery of Art, Skopje "Përtej ngjyrave/Beyond the colors" (2021)

== See also ==
- Kosova National Art Gallery
- Muslim Mulliqi
- Albanians in Kosovo
