= Ludwig Mach =

Austrian physician and inventor (1868–1951)

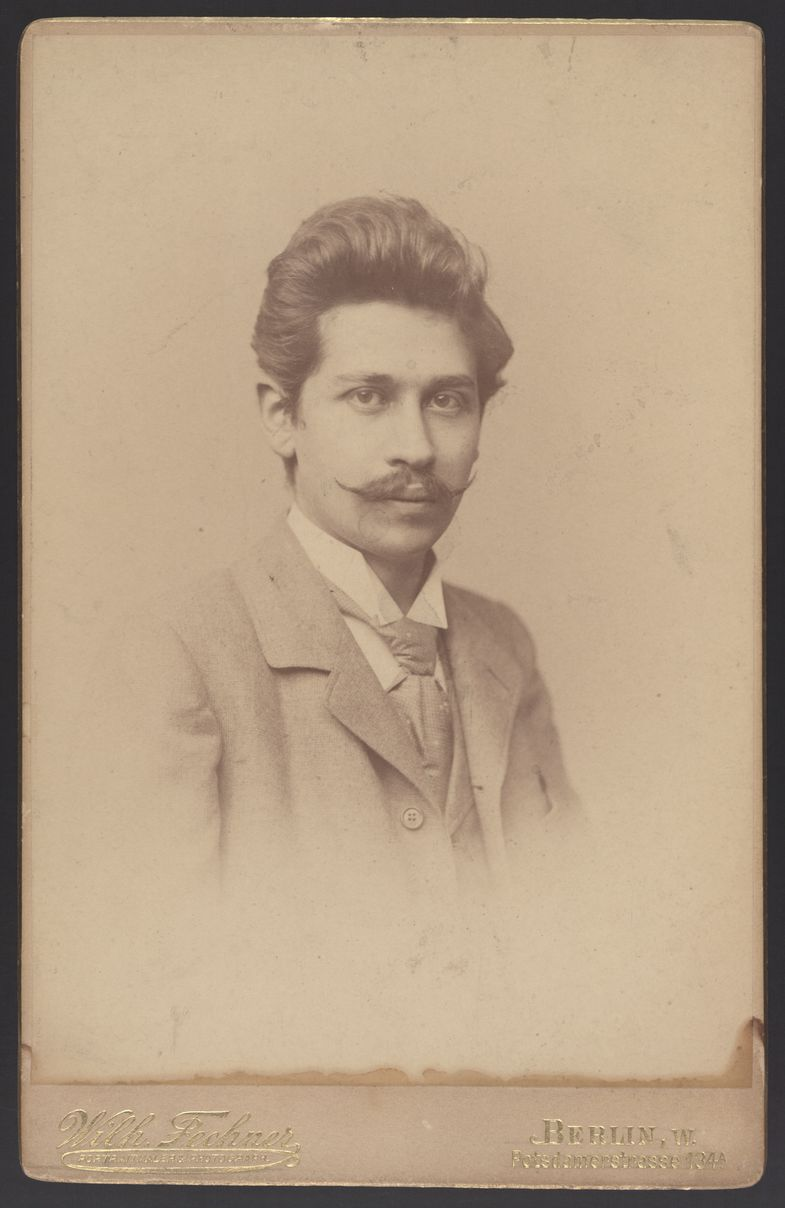
- Born: November 8, 1868; Prague, Austria-Hungary
- Died: September 1951 (aged 82)
- Known for: Mach–Zehnder interferometer
- Parents: Ernst Mach (father); Ludovica Mach, née Marussig (mother)

Ludwig Mach (8 November 1868, in Prague – September 1951) was an Austrian physician and inventor.

Ludwig was the son of the physicist Ernst Mach.

In 1892, Ludwig Mach developed an instrument which became known as the Mach–Zehnder interferometer. The name is due to the fact that Ludwig Zehnder independently developed a nearly identical device. Mach went on to employ photography for collecting visual data streamlines in the field of aerodynamics.

In 1895, he earned his medical doctorate, but he only worked as a physician for a short time.

In 1899 and 1900, he registered patents for aluminum alloys with 2% to 23% magnesium. This invention which he termed Magnalium was to be the precursor of the entire 5000 series of aluminum alloys. Its commercialization brought him significant profits.

In his later years, Ludwig Mach tried to experimentally disprove Albert Einstein’s theory of relativity. He even forged a preface under his father’s name that criticized the theory, which brought him notoriety after his death.

== See also ==
- Velocimetry
