= Molecular tagging velocimetry =

Schematic setup of a molecular tagging velocimetry experiment

Molecular tagging velocimetry (MTV) is a specific form of flow velocimetry, a technique for determining the velocity of currents in fluids such as air and water. In its simplest form, a single "write" laser beam is shot once through the sample space. Along its path an optically induced chemical process is initiated, resulting in the creation of a new chemical species or in changing the internal energy state of an existing one, so that the molecules struck by the laser beam can be distinguished from the rest of the fluid. Such molecules are said to be "tagged".

This line of tagged molecules is now transported by the fluid flow. To obtain velocity information, images at two instances in time are obtained and analyzed (often by correlation of the image intensities) to determine the displacement. If the flow is three-dimensional or turbulent the line will not only be displaced, it will also be deformed.

== Description ==
There are three optical ways via which these tagged molecules can be visualized: fluorescence, phosphorescence and laser-induced fluorescence (LIF). In all three cases molecules relax to a lower state and their excess energy is released as photons. In fluorescence this energy decay occurs rapidly (within $10^{-7}$ s to $10^{-9}$ s at atmospheric pressure), thus making "direct" fluorescence impractical for tagging. In phosphorescence the decay is slower, because the transition is quantum-mechanically forbidden.

In some "writing" schemes, the tagged molecule ends up in an excited state. If the molecule relaxes through phosphorescence, lasting long enough to see line displacement, this can be used to track the written line and no additional visualisation step is needed. If during tagging the molecule did not reach a phosphorescing state, or relaxed before the molecule was "read", a second step is needed. The tagged molecule is then excited using a second laser beam, employing a wavelength such that it specifically excites the tagged molecule. The molecule will fluoresce and this fluorescence is captured by means of a camera. This manner of visualisation is called laser induced fluorescence (LIF).

Optical techniques are frequently used in modern fluid velocimetry but most are opto-mechanical in nature. Opto-mechanical techniques do not rely on photonics alone for flow measurements but require macro-size seeding. The best known and often used examples are particle image velocimetry (PIV) and laser Doppler velocimetry (LDV). Within the field of all-optical techniques we can distinguish analogous techniques but using molecular tracers. In Doppler schemes, light quasi-elastically scatters off molecules and the velocity of the molecules convey a Doppler shift to the frequency of the scattered light. In molecular tagging techniques, like in PIV, velocimetry is based on visualizing the tracer displacements.

== Schemes ==
MTV techniques have proven to allow measurements of velocities in inhospitable environments, like jet engines, flames, high-pressure vessels, where it is difficult for techniques like Pitot, hot-wire velocimetry and PIV to work. The field of MTV is fairly young; the first demonstration of implementation emerged within the 1980s and the number of schemes developed and investigated for use in air is still fairly small. These schemes differ in the molecule that is created, whether seeding the flow with foreign molecules is necessary and what wavelength of light is being used.

=== In gases ===
The most thorough fluid mechanics studies in gas have been performed using the RELIEF scheme and the APART scheme. Both techniques can be used in ambient air without the need for additional seeding. In RELIEF, excited oxygen is used as a tracer. The method takes advantage of quantum mechanical properties that prohibit relaxation of the molecule so that the excited oxygen has a relatively long lifetime.

APART is based on the "photosynthesis" of nitric oxide. Since NO is a stable molecule, patterns written with it can, in principle, be followed almost indefinitely.

Another well-developed and widely documented technique that yields extremely high accuracy is hydroxyl tagging velocimetry (HTV). It is based on photo-dissociation of water vapor followed by visualization of the resulting OH radical using LIF. HTV has been successfully demonstrated in many test conditions ranging from room air temperature flows to Mach 2 flows within a cavity.

=== In liquids ===
In liquids, three MTV approaches have been classified: MTV by direct phosphorescence (using a phosphorescent dye), absorbance (using a photochromic dye), and photoproduct fluorescence (typically using a caged dye).

MTV based on direct phosphorescence is the easiest technique to implement because a single laser is needed to produce a luminescent excited molecular state. The phosphorescence signal is generally weaker and harder to detect than fluorescence.

The second technique called MTV by absorbance relies on the reversible alteration of the fluorescence properties of a photochromic dye. The scheme showed good results in alcohol and oils, but not in water in which typical dyes are not soluble.

The third variant of MTV was first deployed in liquids in 1995 under the name "photoactivated nonintrusive tracking of molecular motion" (PHANTOMM). The PHANTOMM technique initially relied on a fluorescein-based caged dye excited by a blue laser. More recently, a rhodamine-based caged dye was successfully used with pulsed UV and green lasers.

== See also ==
- Hot-wire anemometry
- Laser-induced fluorescence
- Particle image velocimetry
