= HTV Mostar =

- Country: Bosnia and Herzegovina
- Headquarters: Mostar

Programming
- Language(s): Croatian
- Picture format: 4:3 576i SDTV

Ownership
- Owner: "Hrvatska radiotelevizija Mostar" d.o.o. Mostar

History
- Launched: 19 June 1998
- Closed: 20 June 2011

HTV Mostar (Croatian: Hrvatska televizija Mostar) was a Croatian-language television channel based in Mostar, Bosnia and Herzegovina. The program is mainly produced in Croatian. The TV station was established in 1998 and dissolved in 2011.
