= Hydroxyl tagging velocimetry =

Hydroxyl tagging velocimetry (HTV) is a velocimetry method used in humid air flows. The method is often used in high-speed combusting flows because the high velocity and temperature accentuate its advantages over similar methods. HTV uses a laser (often an argon-fluoride excimer laser operating at ~193 nm) to dissociate the water in the flow into H + OH. Before entering the flow optics are used to create a grid of laser beams. The water in the flow is dissociated only where beams of sufficient energy pass through the flow, thus creating a grid in the flow where the concentrations of hydroxyl (OH) are higher than in the surrounding flow. Another laser beam (at either ~248 nm or ~308 nm) in the form of a sheet is also passed through the flow in the same plane as the grid. This laser beam is tuned to a wavelength that causes the hydroxyl molecules to fluoresce in the UV spectrum. The fluorescence is then captured by a charge-coupled device (CCD) camera. Using electronic timing methods the picture of the grid can be captured at nearly the same instant that the grid is created.

By delaying the pulse of the fluorescence laser and the camera shot, an image of the grid that has now displaced downstream can be captured. Computer programs are then used to compare the two images and determine the displacement of the grid. By dividing the displacement by the known time delay the two dimensional velocity field (in the plane of the grid) can be determined. Flow ratios, however, are shown to affect the impingement locations, where increased air flow ratios can reduce the required combustor size by isolating reaction products solely within the secondary cavity.

Other molecular tagging velocimetry (MTV) methods have used ozone (O_{3}), excited oxygen and nitric oxide as the tag instead of hydroxyl. In the case of ozone the method is known as ozone tagging velocimetry or OTV. OTV has been developed and tested in many room air temperature applications with very accurate test results. OTV consists of an initial "write" step, where a 193-nm pulsed excimer laser creates ozone grid lines via oxygen (O_{2}) UV absorption, and a subsequent "read" step, where a 248-nm excimer laser photodissociates the formed O_{3} and fluoresces the vibrationally excited O_{2} product thus revealing the grid lines' displacement.
