= Laser-induced fluorescence =

Spectroscopic method

Laser-induced fluorescence (LIF) or laser-stimulated fluorescence (LSF) is a spectroscopic method in which an atom or molecule is excited to a higher energy level by the absorption of laser light followed by spontaneous emission of light. It was first reported by Zare and coworkers in 1968.

LIF is used for studying structure of molecules, detection of selective species and flow visualization and measurements. The wavelength is often selected to be the one at which the species has its largest cross section. The excited species will after some time, usually in the order of few nanoseconds to microseconds, spontaneously decay and emit a photon at a wavelength longer than the excitation wavelength. This fluorescent light is typically recorded with a photomultiplier tube (PMT), charged-coupled device (CCD), or filtered photodiodes.

== Types ==
Two different kinds of spectra exist, disperse spectra and excitation spectra.

The disperse spectra are performed with a fixed lasing wavelength, as above and the fluorescence spectrum is analyzed. Excitation scans on the other hand collect fluorescent light at a fixed emission wavelength or range of wavelengths. Instead the lasing wavelength is changed.

An advantage over absorption spectroscopy is that it is possible to get two- and three-dimensional images since fluorescence takes place in all directions (i.e. the fluorescence signal is usually isotropic). The signal-to-noise ratio of the fluorescence signal is very high, providing a good sensitivity to the process. It is also possible to distinguish between more species, since the lasing wavelength can be tuned to a particular excitation of a given species which is not shared by other species.

LIF is useful in the study of the electronic structure of molecules and their interactions. It has also been successfully applied for quantitative measurement of concentrations in fields like combustion, plasma, spray and flow phenomena (such as molecular tagging velocimetry), in some cases visualizing concentrations down to nanomolar levels. LED-induced fluorescence has been used in situ to delineate aromatic hydrocarbon contamination as a cone penetrometer add on module and also as a percussive capable asset.

== Applications ==
- Detection of purity
- Optical tumor diagnosis
- Imaging of paleontological specimens
- Detection and quantification of biomolecules and biological processes (e.g. DNA sequencing, trace protein analysis, polymerase chain reaction products, and single-cell analysis)
- In plasma diagnostics, which measures plasma properties such as the ion distribution function and velocity space diffusion and convection in a plasma
- It is often used in combustion diagnostics to detect short-lived radicals which occur in the reaction zone, such as OH

== See also ==
- Fluorescence microscope
- Planar laser-induced fluorescence
- Ultrafast laser spectroscopy
