= Muslim Mulliqi =

Albanian painter

- Born: 1934; Gjakova, Kingdom of Yugoslavia
- Died: 13 January 1998 (aged 63–64); Prishtina, Federal Republic of Yugoslavia
- Writing career
- Notable work: Kullat e Junikut (The stone towers of Junik)

Muslim Mulliqi (1934 – 13 January 1998) was an impressionist and expressionist painter of Kosovo. Born into a family of artists in town, Mulliqi attended the Academy of Fine Arts in Belgrade under Zoran Petrović, where he also continued his postgraduate studies. Mulliqi exhibited in galleries of Kosovo, ex-Yugoslavia, Italy and Albania. Mulliqi was the initiator of the foundation and vice-president of the Academy of Sciences and Arts of Kosovo. He taught painting in the Faculty of Arts at the University of Prishtina. Kosovo Art Gallery exhibition holds his name. While his creations are everlasting, academic Mulliqi was and will remain one of the most prominent figures of the Albanian art. He died in 1998 in Prishtina.

His work is characterized by bold use of colors, firm rhythm, endless space, influenced by his native Dukagjin region.

== Exhibitions ==
Mulliqi exhibitions include:

- Pallati i Kulturës, Gjakovë(1952)
- Foajeu i Teatrit Popullor, Prishtinë(1956, 1960, 1965)
- Pallati i Kulturës, Smederevo; Galeria e Shtëpisë së APJ-së, Tuzla, Rieka, Pula(1967)
- Foajeu i Teatrit Popullor, Prishtinë(1969)
- Salloni i Vogël Figurativ, Novi Sad(1970)
- Galeria e APJ-së, Beograd(1973)
- Galeria "Gjuro Sallaj", Beograd(1974)
- Galeria "Heleoart", Rome(1975)
- Galeria e Arteve, Prishtinë(1979)
- Klubi i Artistëve, Prishtinë; Galeria Bashkëkohore, Podgorica(1980)
- Pallati i Kulturës, Banja Luka(1981)
- Galeria "Forum", Zagreb(1982, 1991)
- Galeria e Vogël, Ljubljana(1984)
- Galeria e Shtëpisë së APJ-së, Beograd(1986)
- Galeria Moderne, Budva(1987)
- Galeria e KO, Grožnjan(1989, 1990)
- La Galerie, Pejë, Galeria Kombëtare e Arteve, Tirana(1993)
- Galeria "Evropa", Pejë, Galeria "Roma", Prishtinë.(1996)

== Awards ==
Muslim Mulliqi has received the following awards:

- 1990, The First Prize for Painting
- 1974, Salon Prize
- 1974, Purchasing Prize
- 1973, Cetinje's Salon Purchasing Prize
- 1969, KAFA's Prize
- 1968, The Belgrade's Academy of Arts Purchasing Prize
- 1965, Prishtina City November Prize
- 1954, Kosova's December Prize

== See also ==
- Kosova National Art Gallery
- Rexho Mulliqi
- Albanians in Kosovo
