= Particle image velocimetry =

Method to measure velocities in fluid

Particle image velocimetry (PIV) is an optical method of flow visualization used in education and research. It is used to obtain instantaneous velocity measurements and related properties in fluids. The fluid is seeded with tracer particles which, for sufficiently small particles, are assumed to faithfully follow the flow dynamics (the degree to which the particles faithfully follow the flow is represented by the Stokes number). The fluid with entrained particles is illuminated so that particles are visible. The motion of the seeding particles is used to calculate speed and direction (the velocity field) of the flow being studied.

Other techniques used to measure flows are laser Doppler velocimetry and hot-wire anemometry. The main difference between PIV and those techniques is that PIV produces two-dimensional or even three-dimensional vector fields, while the other techniques measure the velocity at a point. During PIV, the particle concentration is such that it is possible to identify individual particles in an image, but not with certainty to track it between images. When the particle concentration is so low that it is possible to follow an individual particle it is called particle tracking velocimetry (which is the standard method of Lagrangian particle tracking in the experimental field), while laser speckle velocimetry is used for cases where the particle concentration is so high that it is difficult to observe individual particles in an image.

Typical PIV apparatus consists of a camera (normally a digital camera with a charge-coupled device (CCD) chip in modern systems), a strobe or laser with an optical arrangement to limit the physical region illuminated (normally a cylindrical lens to convert a light beam to a line), a synchronizer to act as an external trigger for control of the camera and laser, the seeding particles and the fluid under investigation. A fiber-optic cable or liquid light guide may connect the laser to the lens setup. PIV software is used to post-process the optical images.

== History ==
Particle image velocimetry (PIV) is a non-intrusive optical flow measurement technique used to study fluid flow patterns and velocities. PIV has found widespread applications in various fields of science and engineering, including aerodynamics, combustion, oceanography, and biofluids. The development of PIV can be traced back to the early 20th century when researchers started exploring different methods to visualize and measure fluid flow.

The early days of PIV can be credited to the pioneering work of Ludwig Prandtl, a German physicist and engineer, who is often regarded as the father of modern aerodynamics. In the 1920s, Prandtl and his colleagues used shadowgraph and schlieren techniques to visualize and measure flow patterns in wind tunnels. These methods relied on the refractive index differences between the fluid regions of interest and the surrounding medium to generate contrast in the images. However, these methods were limited to qualitative observations and did not provide quantitative velocity measurements.

The early PIV setups were relatively simple and used photographic film as the image recording medium. A laser was used to illuminate particles, such as oil droplets or smoke, added to the flow, and the resulting particle motion was captured on film. The films were then developed and analyzed to obtain flow velocity information. These early PIV systems had limited spatial resolution and were labor-intensive, but they provided valuable insights into fluid flow behavior.

The advent of lasers in the 1960s revolutionized the field of flow visualization and measurement. Lasers provided a coherent and monochromatic light source that could be easily focused and directed, making them ideal for optical flow diagnostics. In the late 1960s and early 1970s, researchers such as Arthur L. Lavoie, Hervé L. J. H. Scohier, and Adrian Fouriaux independently proposed the concept of particle image velocimetry (PIV). PIV was initially used for studying air flows and measuring wind velocities, but its applications soon extended to other areas of fluid dynamics.

In the 1980s, the development of charge-coupled devices (CCDs) and digital image processing techniques revolutionized PIV. CCD cameras replaced photographic film as the image recording medium, providing higher spatial resolution, faster data acquisition, and real-time processing capabilities. Digital image processing techniques allowed for accurate and automated analysis of the PIV images, greatly reducing the time and effort required for data analysis.

The advent of digital imaging and computer processing capabilities in the 1980s and 1990s revolutionized PIV, leading to the development of advanced PIV techniques, such as multi-frame PIV, stereo-PIV, and time-resolved PIV. These techniques allowed for higher accuracy, higher spatial and temporal resolution, and three-dimensional measurements, expanding the capabilities of PIV and enabling its application in more complex flow systems.

In the following decades, PIV continued to evolve and advance in several key areas. One significant advancement was the use of dual or multiple exposures in PIV, which allowed for the measurement of both instantaneous and time-averaged velocity fields. Dual-exposure PIV (often referred to as "stereo PIV" or "stereo-PIV") uses two cameras to capture two consecutive images with a known time delay, allowing for the measurement of three-component velocity vectors in a plane. This provided a more complete picture of the flow field and enabled the study of complex flows, such as turbulence and vortices.

In the 2000s and beyond, PIV continued to evolve with the development of high-power lasers, high-speed cameras, and advanced image analysis algorithms. These advancements have enabled PIV to be used in extreme conditions, such as high-speed flows, combustion systems, and microscale flows, opening up new frontiers for PIV research. PIV has also been integrated with other measurement techniques, such as temperature and concentration measurements, and has been used in emerging fields, such as microscale and nanoscale flows, granular flows, and additive manufacturing.

The advancement of PIV has been driven by the development of new laser sources, cameras, and image analysis techniques. Advances in laser technology have led to the use of high-power lasers, such as Nd:YAG lasers and diode lasers, which provide increased illumination intensity and allow for measurements in more challenging environments, such as high-speed flows and combustion systems. High-speed cameras with improved sensitivity and frame rates have also been developed, enabling the capture of transient flow phenomena with high temporal resolution. Furthermore, advanced image analysis techniques, such as correlation-based algorithms, phase-based methods, and machine learning algorithms, have been developed to enhance the accuracy and efficiency of PIV measurements.

Another major advancement in PIV was the development of digital correlation algorithms for image analysis. These algorithms allowed for more accurate and efficient processing of PIV images, enabling higher spatial resolution and faster data acquisition rates. Various correlation algorithms, such as cross-correlation, Fourier-transform-based correlation, and adaptive correlation, were developed and widely used in PIV research.

PIV has also benefited from the development of computational fluid dynamics (CFD) simulations, which have become powerful tools for predicting and analyzing fluid flow behavior. PIV data can be used to validate and calibrate CFD simulations, and in turn, CFD simulations can provide insights into the interpretation and analysis of PIV data. The combination of experimental PIV measurements and numerical simulations has enabled researchers to gain a deeper understanding of fluid flow phenomena and has led to new discoveries and advancements in various scientific and engineering fields.

In addition to the technical advancements, PIV has also been integrated with other measurement techniques, such as temperature and concentration measurements, to provide more comprehensive and multi-parameter flow measurements. For example, combining PIV with thermographic phosphors or laser-induced fluorescence allows for simultaneous measurement of velocity and temperature or concentration fields, providing valuable data for studying heat transfer, mixing, and chemical reactions in fluid flows.

=== Applications ===
The historical development of PIV has been driven by the need for accurate and non-intrusive flow measurements in various fields of science and engineering. The early years of PIV were marked by the development of basic PIV techniques, such as two-frame PIV, and the application of PIV in fundamental fluid dynamics research, primarily in academic settings. As PIV gained popularity, researchers started using it in more practical applications, such as aerodynamics, combustion, and oceanography.

As PIV continues to advance and evolve, it is expected to find further applications in a wide range of fields, from fundamental research in fluid dynamics to practical applications in engineering, environmental science, and medicine. The continued development of PIV techniques, including advancements in lasers, cameras, image analysis algorithms, and integration with other measurement techniques, will further enhance its capabilities and broaden its applications.

In aerodynamics, PIV has been used to study the flow over aircraft wings, rotor blades, and other aerodynamic surfaces, providing insights into the flow behavior and aerodynamic performance of these systems.

As PIV gained popularity, it found applications in a wide range of fields beyond aerodynamics, including combustion, oceanography, biofluids, and microscale flows. In combustion research, PIV has been used to study the details of combustion processes, such as flame propagation, ignition, and fuel spray dynamics, providing valuable insights into the complex interactions between fuel and air in combustion systems. In oceanography, PIV has been used to study the motion of water currents, waves, and turbulence, aiding in the understanding of ocean circulation patterns and coastal erosion. In biofluids research, PIV has been applied to study blood flow in arteries and veins, respiratory flow, and the motion of cilia and flagella in microorganisms, providing important information for understanding physiological processes and disease mechanisms.

PIV has also been used in new and emerging fields, such as microscale and nanoscale flows, granular flows, and multiphase flows. Micro-PIV and nano-PIV have been used to study flows in microchannels, nanopores, and biological systems at the microscale and nanoscale, providing insights into the unique behaviors of fluids at these length scales. PIV has been applied to study the motion of particles in granular flows, such as avalanches and landslides, and to investigate multiphase flows, such as bubbly flows and oil-water flows, which are important in environmental and industrial processes. In microscale flows, conventional measurement techniques are challenging to apply due to the small length scales involved. Micro-PIV has been used to study flows in microfluidic devices, such as lab-on-a-chip systems, and to investigate phenomena such as droplet formation, mixing, and cell motion, with applications in drug delivery, biomedical diagnostics, and microscale engineering.

PIV has also found applications in advanced manufacturing processes, such as additive manufacturing, where understanding and optimizing fluid flow behavior is critical for achieving high-quality and high-precision products. PIV has been used to study the flow dynamics of gases, liquids, and powders in additive manufacturing processes, providing insights into the process parameters that affect the quality and properties of the manufactured products.

PIV has also been used in environmental science to study the dispersion of pollutants in air and water, sediment transport in rivers and coastal areas, and the behavior of pollutants in natural and engineered systems. In energy research, PIV has been used to study the flow behavior in wind turbines, hydroelectric power plants, and combustion processes in engines and turbines, aiding in the development of more efficient and sustainable energy systems.

== Equipment and apparatus ==
=== Seeding particles ===
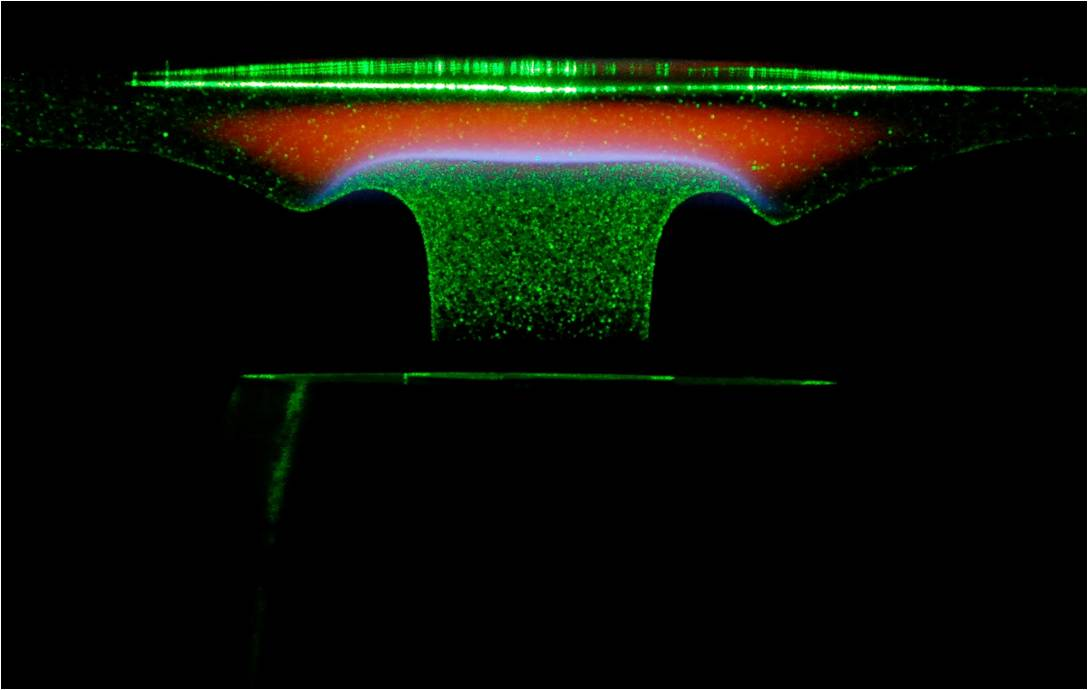
Application of PIV in combustion

The seeding particles are an inherently critical component of the PIV system. Depending on the fluid under investigation, the particles must be able to match the fluid properties reasonably well. Otherwise they will not follow the flow satisfactorily enough for the PIV analysis to be considered accurate. Ideal particles will have the same density as the fluid system being used, and are spherical (these particles are called microspheres). While the actual particle choice is dependent on the nature of the fluid, generally for macro PIV investigations they are glass beads, polystyrene, polyethylene, aluminum flakes or oil droplets (if the fluid under investigation is a gas). Refractive index for the seeding particles should be different from the fluid which they are seeding, so that the laser sheet incident on the fluid flow will reflect off of the particles and be scattered towards the camera.

The particles are typically of a diameter in the order of 10 to 100 micrometers. As for sizing, the particles should be small enough so that response time of the particles to the motion of the fluid is reasonably short to accurately follow the flow, yet large enough to scatter a significant quantity of the incident laser light. For some experiments involving combustion, seeding particle size may be smaller, in the order of 1 micrometer, to avoid the quenching effect that the inert particles may have on flames. Due to the small size of the particles, the particles' motion is dominated by Stokes' drag and settling or rising effects. In a model where particles are modeled as spherical (microspheres) at a very low Reynolds number, the ability of the particles to follow the fluid's flow is inversely proportional to the difference in density between the particles and the fluid, and also inversely proportional to the square of their diameter. The scattered light from the particles is dominated by Mie scattering and so is also proportional to the square of the particles' diameters. Thus the particle size needs to be balanced to scatter enough light to accurately visualize all particles within the laser sheet plane, but small enough to accurately follow the flow.

The seeding mechanism needs to also be designed so as to seed the flow to a sufficient degree without overly disturbing the flow.

=== Camera ===
To perform PIV analysis on the flow, two exposures of laser light are required upon the camera from the flow. Originally, with the inability of cameras to capture multiple frames at high speeds, both exposures were captured on the same frame and this single frame was used to determine the flow. A process called autocorrelation was used for this analysis. However, as a result of autocorrelation the direction of the flow becomes unclear, as it is not clear which particle spots are from the first pulse and which are from the second pulse. Faster digital cameras using CCD or CMOS chips were developed since then that can capture two frames at high speed with a few hundred ns difference between the frames. This has allowed each exposure to be isolated on its own frame for more accurate cross-correlation analysis. The limitation of typical cameras is that this fast speed is limited to a pair of shots. This is because each pair of shots must be transferred to the computer before another pair of shots can be taken. Typical cameras can only take a pair of shots at a much slower speed. High speed CCD or CMOS cameras are available but are much more expensive.

=== Laser and optics ===
For macro PIV setups, lasers are predominant due to their ability to produce high-power light beams with short pulse durations. This yields short exposure times for each frame. Nd:YAG lasers, commonly used in PIV setups, emit primarily at 1064 nm wavelength and its harmonics (532, 266, etc.) For safety reasons, the laser emission is typically bandpass filtered to isolate the 532 nm harmonics (this is green light, the only harmonic able to be seen by the naked eye). A fiber-optic cable or liquid light guide might be used to direct the laser light to the experimental setup.

The optics consist of a spherical lens and cylindrical lens combination. The cylindrical lens expands the laser into a plane while the spherical lens compresses the plane into a thin sheet. This is critical as the PIV technique cannot generally measure motion normal to the laser sheet and so ideally this is eliminated by maintaining an entirely 2-dimensional laser sheet. The spherical lens cannot compress the laser sheet into an actual 2-dimensional plane. The minimum thickness is on the order of the wavelength of the laser light and occurs at a finite distance from the optics setup (the focal point of the spherical lens). This is the ideal location to place the analysis area of the experiment.

The correct lens for the camera should also be selected to properly focus on and visualize the particles within the investigation area.

=== Synchronizer ===
The synchronizer acts as an external trigger for both the camera(s) and the laser. While analogue systems in the form of a photosensor, rotating aperture and a light source have been used in the past, most systems in use today are digital. Controlled by a computer, the synchronizer can dictate the timing of each frame of the CCD camera's sequence in conjunction with the firing of the laser to within 1 ns precision. Thus the time between each pulse of the laser and the placement of the laser shot in reference to the camera's timing can be accurately controlled. Knowledge of this timing is critical as it is needed to determine the velocity of the fluid in the PIV analysis. Stand-alone electronic synchronizers, called digital delay generators, offer variable resolution timing from as low as 250 ps to as high as several ms. With up to eight channels of synchronized timing, they offer the means to control several flash lamps and Q-switches as well as provide for multiple camera exposures.

== Analysis ==
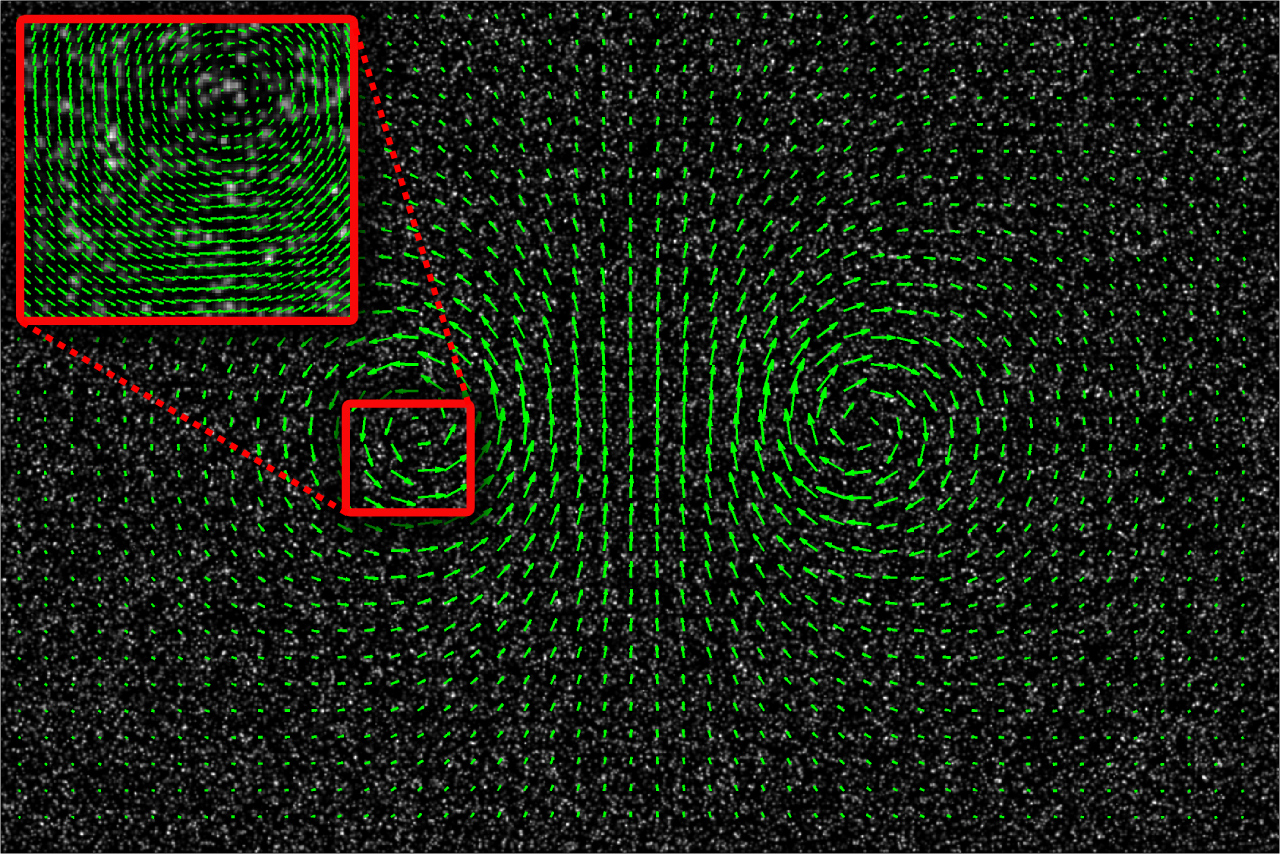
PIV analysis of a vortex pair. The magnification in the upper left shows the increase in spatial resolution that can be achieved using a modern multi-pass window deformation technique.

The frames are split into a large number of interrogation areas, or windows. It is then possible to calculate a displacement vector for each window with help of signal processing and autocorrelation or cross-correlation techniques. This is converted to a velocity using the time between laser shots and the physical size of each pixel on the camera. The size of the interrogation window should be chosen to have at least 6 particles per window on average. A visual example of PIV analysis can be seen here.

The synchronizer controls the timing between image exposures and also permits image pairs to be acquired at various times along the flow. For accurate PIV analysis, it is ideal that the region of the flow that is of interest should display an average particle displacement of about 8 pixels. This is a compromise between a longer time spacing which would allow the particles to travel further between frames, making it harder to identify which interrogation window traveled to which point, and a shorter time spacing, which could make it overly difficult to identify any displacement within the flow.

The scattered light from each particle should be in the region of 2 to 4 pixels across on the image. If too large an area is recorded, particle image size drops and peak locking might occur with loss of sub pixel precision. There are methods to overcome the peak locking effect, but they require some additional work.

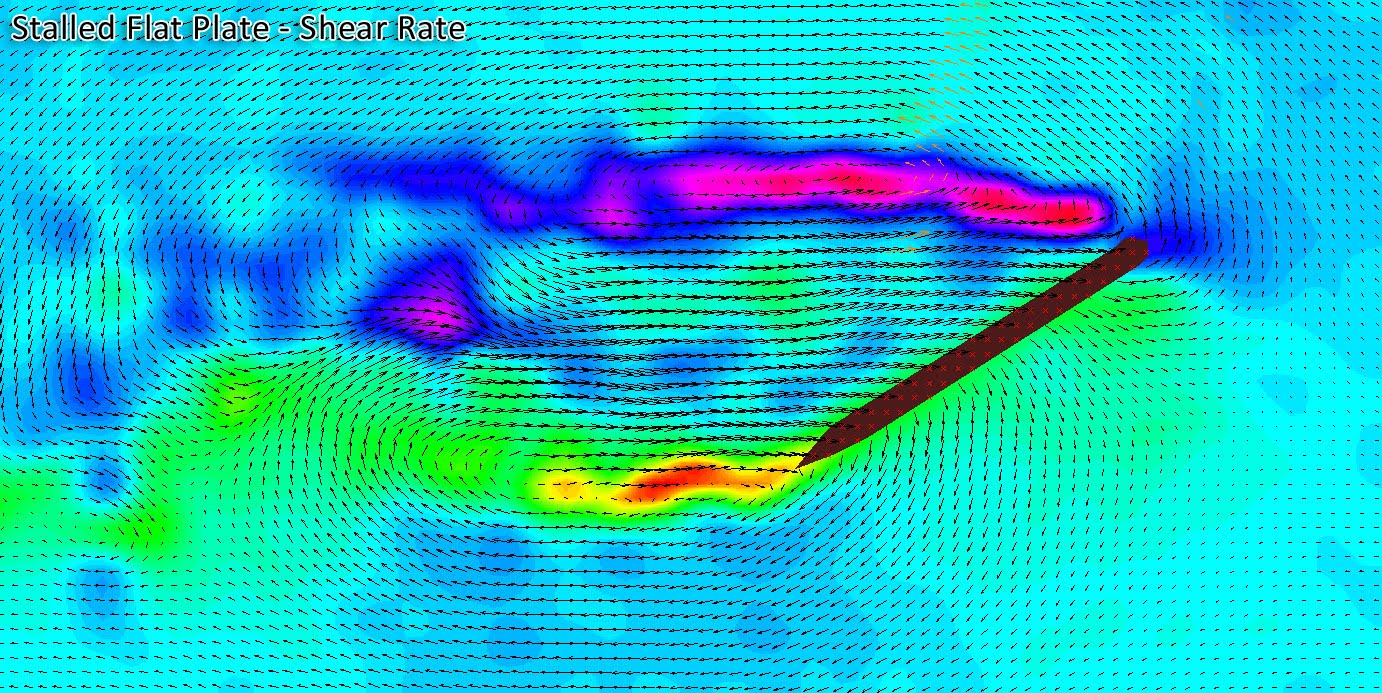
PIV analysis of a stalled flat plate, shear rate superimposed

If there is in house PIV expertise and time to develop a system, even though it is not trivial, it is possible to build a custom PIV system. Research grade PIV systems do, however, have high power lasers and high end camera specifications for being able to take measurements with the broadest spectrum of experiments required in research.

Recent advances in PIV processing methods has led to the development of advanced methods based on optical flow that have been shown to provide superior spatial resolution and accuracy compared to cross-correlation-based PIV analysis . This gain in resolution has been utilized to make state-of-the-art boundary layer measurements using PIV data .

An example of PIV analysis without installation:

PIV is closely related to digital image correlation, an optical displacement measurement technique that uses correlation techniques to study the deformation of solid materials.

== Pros and cons ==
=== Advantages ===
The method is, to a large degree, nonintrusive. The added tracers (if they are properly chosen) generally cause negligible distortion of the fluid flow.

Optical measurement avoids the need for Pitot tubes, hotwire anemometers or other intrusive Flow measurement probes. The method is capable of measuring an entire two-dimensional cross section (geometry) of the flow field simultaneously.

High speed data processing allows the generation of large numbers of image pairs which, on a personal computer may be analysed in real time or at a later time, and a high quantity of near-continuous information may be gained.

Sub pixel displacement values allow a high degree of accuracy, since each vector is the statistical average for many particles within a particular tile. Displacement can typically be accurate down to 10% of one pixel on the image plane.

=== Drawbacks ===
In some cases the particles will, due to their higher density, not perfectly follow the motion of the fluid (gas/liquid). If experiments are done in water, for instance, it is easily possible to find very cheap particles (e.g. plastic powder with a diameter of ~60 μm) with the same density as water. If the density still does not fit, the density of the fluid can be tuned by increasing/ decreasing its temperature. This leads to slight changes in the Reynolds number, so the fluid velocity or the size of the experimental object has to be changed to account for this.

Particle image velocimetry methods will in general not be able to measure components along the z-axis (towards to/away from the camera). These components might not only be missed, they might also introduce an interference in the data for the x/y-components caused by parallax. These problems do not exist in Stereoscopic PIV, which uses two cameras to measure all three velocity components.

Since the resulting velocity vectors are based on cross-correlating the intensity distributions over small areas of the flow, the resulting velocity field is a spatially averaged representation of the actual velocity field. This obviously has consequences for the accuracy of spatial derivatives of the velocity field, vorticity, and spatial correlation functions that are often derived from PIV velocity fields.

PIV systems used in research often use class IV lasers and high-resolution, high-speed cameras, which bring cost and safety constraints.

== More complex PIV setups ==
=== Stereoscopic PIV ===
Stereoscopic PIV utilises two cameras with separate viewing angles to extract the z-axis displacement. Both cameras must be focused on the same spot in the flow and must be properly calibrated to have the same point in focus.

In fundamental fluid mechanics, displacement within a unit time in the X, Y and Z directions are commonly defined by the variables U, V and W. As was previously described, basic PIV extracts the U and V displacements as functions of the in-plane X and Y directions. This enables calculations of the $U_x$, $V_y$, $U_y$ and $V_x$ velocity gradients. However, the other 5 terms of the velocity gradient tensor are unable to be found from this information. The stereoscopic PIV analysis also grants the Z-axis displacement component, W, within that plane. Not only does this grant the Z-axis velocity of the fluid at the plane of interest, but two more velocity gradient terms can be determined: $W_x$ and $W_y$. The velocity gradient components $U_z$, $V_z$, and $W_z$ can not be determined. The velocity gradient components form the tensor:

$$\begin{bmatrix}
U_x & U_y & U_z \\
V_x & V_y & V_z \\
W_x & W_y & W_z \\
\end{bmatrix}$$

=== Dual plane stereoscopic PIV ===
This is an expansion of stereoscopic PIV by adding a second plane of investigation directly offset from the first one. Four cameras are required for this analysis. The two planes of laser light are created by splitting the laser emission with a beam splitter into two beams. Each beam is then polarized orthogonally with respect to one another. Next, they are transmitted through a set of optics and used to illuminate one of the two planes simultaneously.

The four cameras are paired into groups of two. Each pair focuses on one of the laser sheets in the same manner as single-plane stereoscopic PIV. Each of the four cameras has a polarizing filter designed to only let pass the polarized scattered light from the respective planes of interest. This essentially creates a system by which two separate stereoscopic PIV analysis setups are run simultaneously with only a minimal separation distance between the planes of interest.

This technique allows the determination of the three velocity gradient components single-plane stereoscopic PIV could not calculate: $U_z$, $V_z$, and $W_z$. With this technique, the entire velocity gradient tensor of the fluid at the 2-dimensional plane of interest can be quantified. A difficulty arises in that the laser sheets should be maintained close enough together so as to approximate a two-dimensional plane, yet offset enough that meaningful velocity gradients can be found in the z-direction.

=== Multi-plane stereoscopic PIV ===
There are several extensions of the dual-plane stereoscopic PIV idea available. There is an option to create several parallel laser sheets using a set of beamsplitters and quarter-wave plates, providing three or more planes, using a single laser unit and stereoscopic PIV setup, called XPIV.

=== Micro PIV ===
With the use of an epifluorescent microscope, microscopic flows can be analyzed. MicroPIV makes use of fluorescing particles that excite at a specific wavelength and emit at another wavelength. Laser light is reflected through a dichroic mirror, travels through an objective lens that focuses on the point of interest, and illuminates a regional volume. The emission from the particles, along with reflected laser light, shines back through the objective, the dichroic mirror and through an emission filter that blocks the laser light. Where PIV draws its 2-dimensional analysis properties from the planar nature of the laser sheet, microPIV utilizes the ability of the objective lens to focus on only one plane at a time, thus creating a 2-dimensional plane of viewable particles.

MicroPIV particles are on the order of several hundred nm in diameter, meaning they are extremely susceptible to Brownian motion. Thus, a special ensemble averaging analysis technique must be utilized for this technique. The cross-correlation of a series of basic PIV analyses are averaged together to determine the actual velocity field. Thus, only steady flows can be investigated. Special preprocessing techniques must also be utilized since the images tend to have a zero-displacement bias from background noise and low signal-noise ratios. Usually, high numerical aperture objectives are also used to capture the maximum emission light possible. Optic choice is also critical for the same reasons.

=== Holographic PIV ===
Holographic PIV (HPIV) encompasses a variety of experimental techniques which use the interference of coherent light scattered by a particle and a reference beam to encode information of the amplitude and phase of the scattered light incident on a sensor plane. This encoded information, known as a hologram, can then be used to reconstruct the original intensity field by illuminating the hologram with the original reference beam via optical methods or digital approximations. The intensity field is interrogated using 3-D cross-correlation techniques to yield a velocity field.

Off-axis HPIV uses separate beams to provide the object and reference waves. This setup is used to avoid speckle noise form being generated from interference of the two waves within the scattering medium, which would occur if they were both propagated through the medium. An off-axis experiment is a highly complex optical system comprising numerous optical elements, and the reader is referred to an example schematic in Sheng et al. for a more complete presentation.

In-line holography is another approach that provides some unique advantages for particle imaging. Perhaps the largest of these is the use of forward scattered light, which is orders of magnitude brighter than scattering oriented normal to the beam direction. Additionally, the optical setup of such systems is much simpler because the residual light does not need to be separated and recombined at a different location. The in-line configuration also provides a relatively easy extension to apply CCD sensors, creating a separate class of experiments known as digital in-line holography. The complexity of such setups shifts from the optical setup to image post-processing, which involves the use of simulated reference beams. Further discussion of these topics is beyond the scope of this article and is treated in Arroyo and Hinsch

A variety of issues degrade the quality of HPIV results. The first class of issues involves the reconstruction itself. In holography, the object wave of a particle is typically assumed to be spherical; however, due to Mie scattering theory, this wave is a complex shape which can distort the reconstructed particle. Another issue is the presence of substantial speckle noise which lowers the overall signal-to-noise ratio of particle images. This effect is of greater concern for in-line holographic systems because the reference beam is propagated through the volume along with the scattered object beam. Noise can also be introduced through impurities in the scattering medium, such as temperature variations and window blemishes. Because holography requires coherent imaging, these effects are much more severe than traditional imaging conditions. The combination of these factors increases the complexity of the correlation process. In particular, the speckle noise in an HPIV recording often prevents traditional image-based correlation methods from being used. Instead, single particle identification and correlation are implemented, which set limits on particle number density. A more comprehensive outline of these error sources is given in Meng et al.

In light of these issues, it may seem that HPIV is too complicated and error-prone to be used for flow measurements. However, many impressive results have been obtained with all holographic approaches. Svizher and Cohen used a hybrid HPIV system to study the physics of hairpin vortices. Tao et al. investigated the alignment of vorticity and strain rate tensors in high Reynolds number turbulence. As a final example, Sheng et al. used holographic microscopy to perform near-wall measurements of turbulent shear stress and velocity in turbulent boundary layers.

=== Scanning PIV ===
By using a rotating mirror, a high-speed camera and correcting for geometric changes, PIV can be performed nearly instantly on a set of planes throughout the flow field. Fluid properties between the planes can then be interpolated. Thus, a quasi-volumetric analysis can be performed on a target volume. Scanning PIV can be performed in conjunction with the other 2-dimensional PIV methods described to approximate a 3-dimensional volumetric analysis.

=== Tomographic PIV ===
Tomographic PIV is based on the illumination, recording, and reconstruction of tracer particles within a 3-D measurement volume. The technique uses several cameras to record simultaneous views of the illuminated volume, which is then reconstructed to yield a discretized 3-D intensity field. A pair of intensity fields are analyzed using 3-D cross-correlation algorithms to calculate the 3-D, 3-C velocity field within the volume. The technique was originally developed by Elsinga et al. in 2006.

The reconstruction procedure is a complex under-determined inverse problem. The primary complication is that a single set of views can result from a large number of 3-D volumes. Procedures to properly determine the unique volume from a set of views are the foundation for the field of tomography. In most Tomo-PIV experiments, the multiplicative algebraic reconstruction technique (MART) is used. The advantage of this pixel-by-pixel reconstruction technique is that it avoids the need to identify individual particles. Reconstructing the discretized 3-D intensity field is computationally intensive and, beyond MART, several developments have sought to significantly reduce this computational expense, for example the multiple line-of-sight simultaneous multiplicative algebraic reconstruction technique (MLOS-SMART) which takes advantage of the sparsity of the 3-D intensity field to reduce memory storage and calculation requirements.

As a rule of thumb, at least four cameras are needed for acceptable reconstruction accuracy, and best results are obtained when the cameras are placed at approximately 30 degrees normal to the measurement volume. Many additional factors are necessary to consider for a successful experiment.

Tomo-PIV has been applied to a broad range of flows. Examples include the structure of a turbulent boundary layer/shock wave interaction, the vorticity of a cylinder wake or pitching airfoil, rod-airfoil aeroacoustic experiments, and to measure small-scale, micro flows. More recently, Tomo-PIV has been used together with 3-D particle tracking velocimetry to understand predator-prey interactions, and portable version of Tomo-PIV has been used to study unique swimming organisms in Antarctica.

=== Thermographic PIV ===
Thermographic PIV is based on the use of thermographic phosphors as seeding particles. The use of these thermographic phosphors permits simultaneous measurement of velocity and temperature in a flow.

Thermographic phosphors consist of ceramic host materials doped with rare-earth or transition metal ions, which exhibit phosphorescence when they are illuminated with UV-light. The decay time and the spectra of this phosphorescence are temperature sensitive and offer two different methods to measure temperature. The decay time method consists on the fitting of the phosphorescence decay to an exponential function and is normally used in point measurements, although it has been demonstrated in surface measurements. The intensity ratio between two different spectral lines of the phosphorescence emission, tracked using spectral filters, is also temperature-dependent and can be employed for surface measurements.

The micrometre-sized phosphor particles used in thermographic PIV are seeded into the flow as a tracer and, after illumination with a thin laser light sheet, the temperature of the particles can be measured from the phosphorescence, normally using an intensity ratio technique. It is important that the particles are of small size so that not only they follow the flow satisfactorily but also they rapidly assume its temperature. For a diameter of 2 μm, the thermal slip between particle and gas is as small as the velocity slip.

Illumination of the phosphor is achieved using UV light. Most thermographic phosphors absorb light in a broad band in the UV and therefore can be excited using a YAG:Nd laser. Theoretically, the same light can be used both for PIV and temperature measurements, but this would mean that UV-sensitive cameras are needed. In practice, two different beams originated in separate lasers are overlapped. While one of the beams is used for velocity measurements, the other is used to measure the temperature.

The use of thermographic phosphors offers some advantageous features including ability to survive in reactive and high temperature environments, chemical stability and insensitivity of their phosphorescence emission to pressure and gas composition. In addition, thermographic phosphors emit light at different wavelengths, allowing spectral discrimination against excitation light and background.

Thermographic PIV has been demonstrated for time averaged and single shot measurements. Recently, also time-resolved high speed (3 kHz) measurements have been successfully performed.

=== Artificial Intelligence PIV ===
With the development of artificial intelligence, there have been scientific publications and commercial software proposing PIV calculations based on deep learning and convolutional neural networks. The methodology used stems mainly from optical flow neural networks popular in machine vision. A data set that includes particle images is generated to train the parameters of the networks. The result is a deep neural network for PIV which can provide estimation of dense motion, down to a maximum of one vector for one pixel if the recorded images allow. AI PIV promises a dense velocity field, not limited by the size of the interrogation window, which limits traditional PIV to one vector per 16 x 16 pixels.

=== Real time processing and applications of PIV ===
With the advance of digital technologies, real time processing and applications of PIV became possible. For instance, GPUs can be used to speed up substantially the direct of Fourier transform based correlations of single interrogation windows. Similarly multi-processing, parallel or multi-threading processes on several CPUs or multi-core CPUs are beneficial for the distributed processing of multiple interrogation windows or multiple images. Some of the applications use real time image processing methods, such as FPGA based on-the-fly image compression or image processing. More recently, the PIV real time measurement and processing capabilities are implemented for the future use in active flow control with the flow based feedback.

=== Particle Shadow Velocimetry ===
Particle shadow velocimetry (PSV) is a cheaper and lower-cost alternative to PIV that aims to image the shadows cast by the particles, rather than the Mie-scattering signal resulting from the laser-particle interaction As PSV relies on capturing the shadows cast by the particles on the sensor, it does not require a laser, making it cheaper and accessible. The lack of necessity of using a laser in a PSV system makes it much more advantageous to use it in multi-phase flows (such as bubbly flows, free-surface flows, boundary layer flows, etc.) as the lack of laser remedies scattering and reflections that usually corrupt the PIV data right at the phase boundaries. It has been shown that PSV is capable of capturing the PIV data with the same accuracy. .

== Applications ==
PIV has been applied to a wide range of flow problems, varying from the flow over an aircraft wing in a wind tunnel to vortex formation in prosthetic heart valves. 3-dimensional techniques have been sought to analyze turbulent flow and jets.

Rudimentary PIV algorithms based on cross-correlation can be implemented in a matter of hours, while more sophisticated algorithms may require a significant investment of time. Several open source implementations are available. Application of PIV in the US education system has been limited due to high price and safety concerns of industrial research grade PIV systems.

=== Granular PIV: velocity measurement in granular flows and avalanches ===
PIV can also be used to measure the velocity field of the free surface and basal boundary in a granular flows such as those in shaken containers, tumblers and avalanches. This analysis is particularly well-suited for nontransparent media such as sand, gravel, quartz, or other granular materials that are common in geophysics. This PIV approach is called "granular PIV". The set-up for granular PIV differs from the usual PIV setup in that the optical surface structure which is produced by illumination of the surface of the granular flow is already sufficient to detect the motion. This means one does not need to add tracer particles in the bulk material.

== See also ==
- Digital image correlation
- Hot-wire anemometry
- Laser Doppler velocimetry
- Molecular tagging velocimetry
- Particle tracking velocimetry

== Bibliography ==
- Raffel, M.; Willert, C.; Wereley, S.; Kompenhans, J. (2007). Particle Image Velocimetry: A Practical Guide. Springer-Verlag. ISBN 978-3-540-72307-3.
- Adrian, R.J.; Westerweel, J. (2011). Particle Image Velocimetry. Cambridge University Press. ISBN 978-0-521-44008-0.
