= Velocity interferometer system for any reflector =

Measurement system

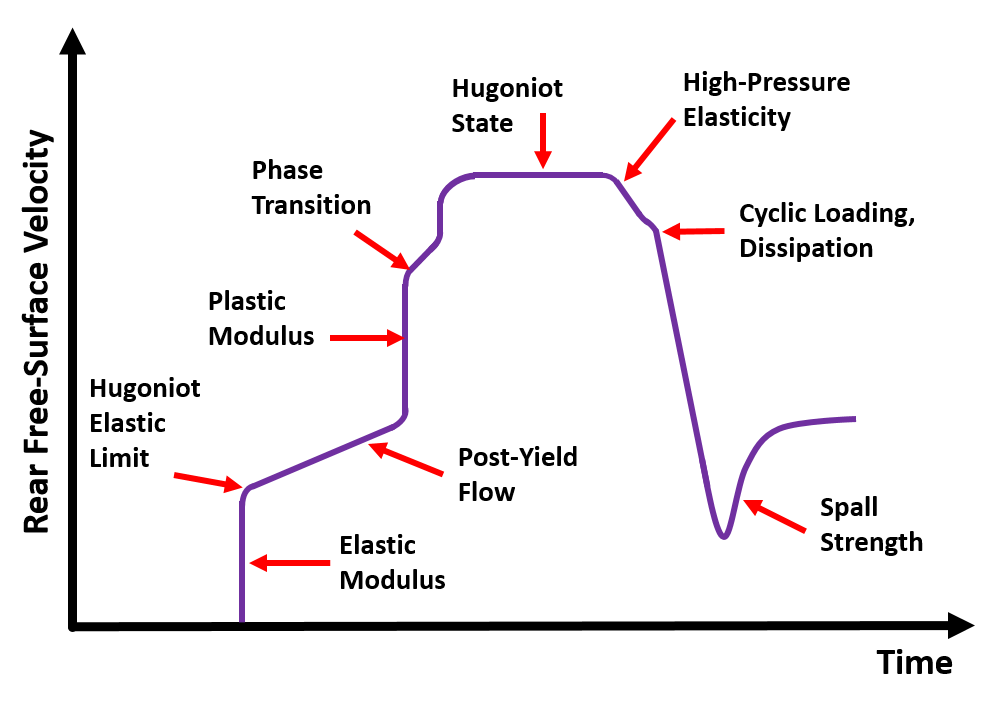
Profile of a shockwave going through a solid, Adapted from Marc Meyers's "Dynamic Behavior of Materials"

Velocity interferometer system for any reflector (VISAR) is a time-resolved velocity measurement system that uses laser interferometry to measure the surface velocities of solids moving at high speeds. For solids experiencing high-velocity impact or explosive conditions, VISAR plots the free-surface velocity against time to show the shock wave profile of a material (See Figure). VISAR is a useful tool in determining the pressure-density relationship of a material known as the Rankine–Hugoniot conditions or simply the "Hugoniot".

In recent years, another time-resolved velocity-measurement tool called laser Doppler velocimetry has achieved popularity in the shock physics community as an adjunct or replacement for VISAR. This device is essentially a displacement interferometer of the normal Michelson variety. As such, it requires extremely fast data-acquisition devices (digital oscilloscopes with bandwidths of 10 GHz or higher) and is limited in the range of velocities it can cover. As the surface moves, the reflected light interferes with itself, and sinusoidal fringes in light intensity are produced and recorded. A cycle of light intensity or fringe count indicates a displacement of the surface corresponding to one wavelength of the light. The rate at which these fringes occur is thus proportional to the velocity of the surface. To derive a velocity history, the fringe (displacement) data must be differentiated with respect to time, usually by Fourier analysis. This differentiation or FA step inevitably reduces the time resolution and accuracy of the velocity history.

The VISAR on the other hand is configured to "optically differentiate" so that the light intensity variation due to interference varies sinusoidally with the velocity of the surface, not the displacement. Also called a delay-leg interferometer, it remains the best and most accurate method for recording the velocity history of fast-moving surfaces.

The original VISARs were built at the National Laboratories and had free-space beams on optical tables with discrete optical components such as beam-splitting pellicles, mirrors, quarter-wave delay plates, glass etalons, high-voltage photomultiplier tubes, argon ion lasers, and so on. Modern versions such as the Mark IV-3000 from Martin, Froeschner & Associates (mfaoptics.com) implement the same optical arrangement entirely in single-mode optical fibre with all-solid-state telecom components such as InGaAs photodiodes, erbium-doped fibre amplifiers, and extremely-high-purity (< 2 kHz linewidth) lasers. Velocity resolution down to 0.01 m/s has been demonstrated with time resolution < 1ns.
