= Laser Doppler velocimetry =

Optical method of measuring fluid flow

Laser Doppler velocimetry, also known as laser Doppler anemometry, is the technique of using the Doppler shift in a laser beam to measure the velocity in transparent or semi-transparent fluid flows or the linear or vibratory motion of opaque, reflecting surfaces. The measurement with laser Doppler anemometry is absolute and linear with velocity and requires no pre-calibration.

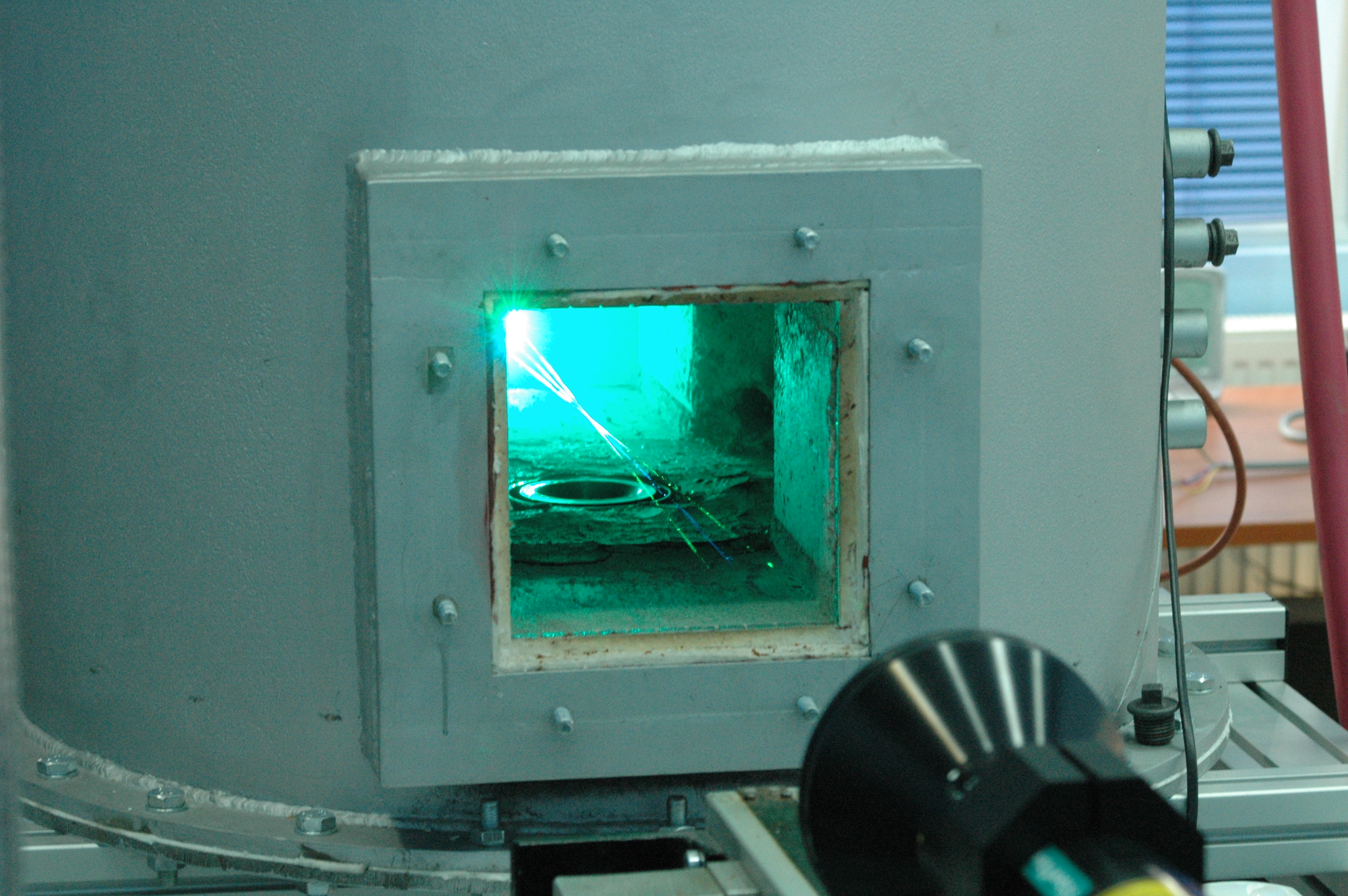
Laser Doppler anemometry facility operating at Laboratory of Gas Technology (Poznań University of Technology).

== Technology origin ==
The development of the helium–neon laser (He-Ne) in 1962 at the Bell Telephone Laboratories provided the optics community with a continuous wave electromagnetic radiation source that was highly concentrated at a wavelength of 632.8 nanometers (nm) in the red portion of the visible spectrum. It was discovered that fluid flow measurements could be made using the Doppler effect on a He-Ne beam scattered by small polystyrene spheres in the fluid.

At the Research Laboratories of Brown Engineering Company (later Teledyne Brown Engineering), this phenomenon was used to develop the first laser Doppler flowmeter using heterodyne signal processing. This instrument became known as the laser Doppler velocimeter and the technique was called laser Doppler velocimetry. It is also referred to as laser Doppler anemometry.

Early laser Doppler velocimetry applications included measuring and mapping the exhaust from rocket engines with speeds up to 1000 m/s, as well as determining flow in a near-surface blood artery. Similar instruments were also developed for solid surface monitoring, with applications ranging from measuring product speeds in production lines of paper and steel mills to measuring vibration frequency and amplitude of surfaces.

== Operating principles ==
In its simplest and most presently used form, laser Doppler velocimetry crosses two beams of collimated, monochromatic, and coherent laser light in the flow of the fluid being measured. The two beams are usually obtained by splitting a single beam, thus ensuring coherence between the two. Lasers with wavelengths in the visible spectrum (390–750 nm) are commonly used; these are typically He-Ne, Argon ion, or laser diode, allowing the beam path to be observed. A transmitting optics system focuses the beams to intersect at their waists (the focal point of a laser beam), where they interfere and generate a set of straight fringes. As particles (either naturally occurring or induced) entrained in the fluid pass through the fringes, they scatter light that is then collected by a receiving optics and focused on a photodetector (typically an avalanche photodiode).

The scattered light fluctuates in intensity, the frequency of which is equivalent to the Doppler shift between the incident and scattered light, and is thus proportional to the component of particle velocity which lies in the plane of two laser beams. If the sensor is aligned to the flow such that the fringes are perpendicular to the flow direction, the electrical signal from the photodetector will then be proportional to the full particle velocity. By combining three devices (e.g., He-Ne, Argon ion, and laser diode) with different wavelengths, all three flow velocity components can be simultaneously measured.

Another form of laser Doppler velocimetry, particularly used in early device developments, has a completely different approach akin to an interferometer. The sensor also splits the laser beam into two parts; one (the measurement beam) is focused into the flow and the second (the reference beam) passes outside the flow. A receiving optics provides a path that intersects the measurement beam, forming a small volume. Particles passing through this volume will scatter light from the measurement beam with a Doppler shift; a portion of this light is collected by the receiving optics and transferred to the photodetector. The reference beam is also sent to the photodetector where optical heterodyne detection produces an electrical signal proportional to the Doppler shift, by which the particle velocity component perpendicular to the plane of the beams can be determined.

The signal detection scheme of the instrument is using the principle of optical heterodyne detection. This principle is similar to other laser Doppler-based instruments such as laser Doppler vibrometer, or laser surface velocimeter. It is possible to apply digital techniques to the signal to obtain the velocity as a measured fraction of the speed-of-light, and therefore in one sense Laser Doppler velocimetry is a particularly fundamental measurement traceable to the S.I. system of measurement.

== Applications ==
In the decades since the laser Doppler velocimetry was first introduced, there has been a wide variety of laser Doppler sensors developed and applied.

=== Flow research ===
Laser Doppler velocimetry is often chosen over other forms of flow measurement because the equipment can be outside of the flow being measured and therefore has no effect on the flow. Some typical applications include the following:

- Wind tunnel velocity experiments for testing aerodynamics of aircraft, missiles, cars, trucks, trains, and buildings and other structures
- Velocity measurements in water flows (research in general hydrodynamics, ship hull design, rotating machinery, pipe flows, channel flow, etc.)
- Fuel injection and spray research where there is a need to measure velocities inside engines or through nozzles
- Environmental research (combustion research, wave dynamics, coastal engineering, tidal modeling, river hydrology, etc.).

One disadvantage has been that laser Doppler velocimetry sensors are range-dependent; they have to be calibrated minutely and the distances where they measure has to be precisely defined. This distance restriction has recently been at least partially overcome with a new sensor that is range independent.

=== Automation ===
Laser Doppler velocimetry can be useful in automation, which includes the flow examples above. It can also be used to measure the speed of solid objects, like conveyor belts. This can be useful in situations where attaching a rotary encoder (or a different mechanical speed measurement device) to the conveyor belt is impossible or impractical.

=== Medical applications ===
Laser Doppler velocimetry is used in hemodynamics research as a technique to partially quantify blood flow in human tissues such as skin or the eye fundus. Within the clinical environment, the technology is often referred to as laser Doppler flowmetry; when images are made, it is referred to as laser Doppler imaging. The beam from a low-power laser (usually a laser diode) penetrates the skin sufficiently to be scattered with a Doppler shift by the red blood cells and return to be concentrated on a detector. These measurements are useful to monitor the effect of exercise, drug treatments, environmental, or physical manipulations on targeted micro-sized vascular areas.

The laser Doppler vibrometer is being used in clinical otology for the measurement of tympanic membrane (eardrum), malleus (hammer), and prosthesis head displacement in response to sound inputs of 80- to 100-dB sound-pressure level. It also has potential use in the operating room to perform measurements of prosthesis and stapes (stirrup) displacement.

=== Navigation ===
The Autonomous Landing Hazard Avoidance Technology used in NASA's Project Morpheus lunar lander to automatically find a safe landing place contains a lidar Doppler velocimeter that measures the vehicle's altitude and velocity. The AGM-129 ACM cruise missile uses laser doppler velocimeter for precise terminal guidance.

=== Calibration and measurement ===
Laser Doppler velocimetry is used in the analysis of vibration of MEMS devices, often to compare the performance of devices such as accelerometers-on-a-chip with their theoretical (calculated) modes of vibration. As a specific example in which the unique features of Laser Doppler velocimetry are important, the measurement of velocity of a MEMS watt balance device has allowed greater accuracy in the measurement of small forces than previously possible, through directly measuring the ratio of this velocity to the speed of light. This is a fundamental, traceable measurement that now allows traceability of small forces to the S.I. System.

== See also ==
- Hot-wire anemometry
- Laser Doppler imaging
- Laser Doppler vibrometer
- Laser surface velocimeter
- Molecular tagging velocimetry
- Particle image velocimetry
- Particle tracking velocimetry
- Photon Doppler velocimetry
- Velocity interferometer system for any reflector (VISAR)
