= Laser acronyms =

This is a list of acronyms and other initialisms used in laser physics and laser applications.

== A ==
- AOM – acousto-optic modulator
- AOPDF – acousto-optic programmable dispersive filter
- APD – avalanche photodiode
- APM – additive-pulse mode locking
- ASE – amplified spontaneous emission
- ATD – above-threshold dissociation
- ATI – above-threshold ionization
- AWG – arrayed waveguide grating

== B ==
- BPP – beam parameter product

== C ==
- CD-ROM – compact disc read-only memory
- CEO – carrier-envelope offset
- CEP – carrier-envelope phase
- CPA – chirped-pulse amplification
- CRAB – complete reconstruction of attosecond bursts
- CW – continuous wave
- CWDM – coarse wavelength-division multiplexing

== D ==
- DBR – distributed Bragg reflector
- DCM – dispersion-compensation module or double-chirped mirror
- DFB laser – distributed feedback laser
- DFG – difference-frequency generation
- DIAL – differential absorption LIDAR
- DOG – double optical gating
- DOS – density of states
- DPSS – diode-pumped solid-state (laser)
- DWDM – dense wavelength-division multiplexing

== E ==
- ECDL – external-cavity diode laser
- EDC – electronic dispersion compensation
- EDFA – erbium-doped fiber amplifier
- Er:YAG – erbium-doped yttrium aluminium garnet, Er:Y_{3}Al_{5}O_{12}
- EOM – electro-optic modulator
- ESA – excited state absorption

== F ==
- FEL – free electron laser
- FREAG – frequency-resolved electro-absorption gating
- FROG – frequency-resolved optical gating
- FROG-CRAB – frequency-resolved optical gating for complete reconstruction of attosecond bursts
- FWM – four-wave mixing
- FP – Fabry–Perot laser

== G ==
- GRENOUILLE – grating-eliminated no-nonsense observation of ultrafast incident laser light e-fields

== H ==
- HeNe – helium–neon laser
- HHG – high-harmonic generation

== I ==
- IR – infrared

== K ==
- KLM – Kerr-lens modelocking

== L ==
- LASEK – laser-assisted sub-epithelial keratectomy
- LASER – light amplification by stimulated emission of radiation
- LASIK – laser-assisted in situ keratomileusis (eye surgery)
- LBO – lithium triborate
- LiDAR – light detection and ranging
- LLLT – low-level laser therapy

== M ==
- MASER – microwave amplification by stimulated emission of radiation
- MIIPS – multiphoton intrapulse interference phase scan
- MOPA – master oscillator power amplifier

== N ==
- Nd:YAG – neodymium-doped yttrium aluminium garnet, Nd:Y_{3}Al_{5}O_{12}
- Nd:YCOB – neodymium-doped YCOB, YCa_{4}O(BO_{3})_{3}

== O ==
- OC – output coupler
- OPO – optical parametric oscillator
- OPA – optical parametric amplifier / optical parametric amplification
- OPCPA – optical parametric chirped pulse amplification

== P ==
- PI – population inversion

== R ==
- RABBIT or RABBITT – reconstruction of attosecond beating by interference of two-photon transitions
- REMPI – resonance-enhanced multiphoton ionization

== S ==
- SHG – second-harmonic generation
- SLM – single longitudinal mode
- SPIDER – spectral phase interferometry for direct electric-field reconstruction
- SPM – self-phase modulation

== T ==
- TE – transverse electric mode
- TEA – transverse electrical discharge in gas at atmospheric pressure
- TEM – transverse electromagnetic mode
- THG – third-harmonic generation
- Ti:Sapph – Ti-sapphire laser
- TM – transverse magnetic mode

== U ==
- UV – ultraviolet

== V ==
- VCSEL – vertical cavity surface-emitting laser
- VECSEL – vertical external cavity surface-emitting laser

== W ==
- WDM – wavelength-division multiplexing

== X ==
- XPM – cross-phase modulation
- XPW – cross-polarized wave generation

== Y ==
- YAG – yttrium aluminium garnet, Y_{3}Al_{5}O_{12}
- YAM – yttrium aluminium monoclinic
- YAP – yttrium aluminium perovskite
