= Pump–probe microscopy =

Non-linear optical imaging modality

Pump–probe microscopy is a non-linear optical imaging modality used in femtochemistry to study chemical reactions. It is a kind of ultrafast laser spectroscopy. It generates high-contrast images from endogenous non-fluorescent targets. It has numerous applications, including materials science, medicine, and art restoration.

== Advantages ==
The classic method of nonlinear absorption used by microscopists is conventional two-photon fluorescence, in which two photons from a single source interact to excite a photoelectron. The electron then emits a photon as it transitions back to its ground state. This microscopy method has been revolutionary in biological sciences because of its inherent three-dimensional optical sectioning capabilities.

Two-photon absorption is inherently a nonlinear process: fluorescent output intensity is proportional to the square of the excitation light intensity. This ensures that fluorescence is only generated within the focus of a laser beam, as the intensity outside of this plane is insufficient to excite a photoelectron.

However, this microscope modality is inherently limited by the number of biological molecules that can undergo both two-photon excitation and fluorescence.

Pump–probe microscopy circumvents this limitation by directly measuring excitation light. This expands the number of potential targets to any molecule capable of two-photon absorption, even if it does not fluoresce upon relaxation. The method modulates the amplitude of a pulsed laser beam, referred to as the pump, to bring the target molecule to an excited state. This will then affect the properties of a second coherent beam, referred to as the probe, based on the interaction of the two beams with the molecule. These properties are then measured by a detector to form an image.

== Physics of pump–probe microscopy ==
Because pump–probe microscopy does not rely on fluorescent targets, the modality takes advantage of multiple different types of multiphoton absorption.

=== Two-photon absorption ===
Two-photon absorption (TPA) is a third-order process in which two photons are nearly simultaneously absorbed by the same molecule. If a second photon is absorbed by the same electron within the same quantum event, the electron enters an excited state.

This is the same phenomenon used in two-photon microscopy (TPM), but there are two key features that distinguish pump–probe microscopy from TPM. First, since the molecule is not necessarily fluorescent, a photodetector measures the probe intensity. Therefore, the signal decreases as two-photon absorption occurs, the reverse of TPM.

Second, pump–probe microscopy uses spectrally separated sources for each photon, whereas conventional TPM uses one source of a single wavelength. This is referred to as degenerate two-photon excitation.

=== Excited-state absorption ===
Excited-state absorption (ESA) occurs when the pump beam sends an electron into an excited state, then the probe beam sends the electron into a higher excited state. This differs from TPA primarily in the timescale over which it occurs. Since an electron can remain in an excited state for a period of nanoseconds, thus requiring longer pulse durations than TPA.

=== Stimulated emission ===
Pump–probe microscopy can also measure stimulated emission. In this case, the pump beam drives the electron to an excited state. Then the electron emits a photon when exposed to the probe beam. This interaction increases the probe signal at the detector site.

=== Ground-state depletion ===
Ground-state depletion occurs when the pump beam sends the electron into an excited state. However, unlike in ESA, the probe beam cannot send an electron into a secondary excited state. Instead, it sends remaining electrons from the ground state to the first excited state. However, since the pump beam has decreased the number of electrons in the ground state, fewer probe photons are absorbed, and the probe signal increases at the detector site.

=== Cross-phase modulation ===
Cross-phase modulation is caused by the Kerr effect, in which the refractive index of the specimen changes in the presence of a large electric field. In this case, the pump beam modulates the phase of the probe, which can then be measured through interferometric techniques. In certain cases, referred to as cross-phase modulation spectral shifting, this phase change induces a change to the pump spectrum that can be detected with a spectral filter.

== Optical design ==
=== Excitation ===
Measuring nonlinear optical interactions requires a high level of instantaneous power and very precise timing. In order to achieve the high number of photons needed to generate these interactions while avoiding damage of delicate specimens, these microscopes require a modelocked laser. These lasers can achieve very high photon counts on the femtosecond timescale and maintain a low average power. Most systems use a Ti:Sapphire gain medium due to the wide range of wavelengths that it can access.

Typically, the same source is used to generate the pump and the probe. An optical parametric oscillator (OPO) is used to convert the probe beam to the desired wavelength. The probe wavelength can be tuned over a large range for spectroscopic applications.

However, for certain types of two-photon interactions, it is possible to use separate pulsed sources. This is only possible with interactions such as excited-state absorption, in which the electrons remain in the excited state for several picoseconds. However, it is more common to use a single femtosecond source with two separate beam paths of different lengths to modulate timing between the pump and probe beams.

The pump beam amplitude is modulated using an acousto-optic or electro-optic modulator on the order of 10^{7} Hz. The pump and probe beams are then recombined using a dichroic beamsplitter and scanned using galvanometric mirrors for point-by-point image generation before being focused onto the sample.

=== Detection ===
The signal generated by probe modulation is much smaller than the original pump beam, so the two are spectrally separated within the detection path using a dichroic mirror. The probe signal can be collected with many different types of photodetectors, typically a photodiode. Then, the modulated signal is amplified using a lock-in amplifier tuned to the pump modulation frequency.

== Data analysis ==
Similar to hyperspectral data analysis, the pump–probe imaging data, known as a delay stack, has to be processed to obtain an image with molecular contrast of the underlying molecular species. Processing pump–probe data is challenging for several reasons – for example, the signals are bipolar (positive and negative), multi-exponential, and can be significantly altered by subtle changes in the chemical environment. The main methods for analysis of pump–probe data are multi-exponential fitting, principal component analysis, and phasor analysis.

=== Multi-exponential fitting ===
In multi-exponential fitting, the time-resolved curves are fitted with an exponential decay model to determine the decay constants. While this method is straightforward, it has low accuracy.

=== Principal component analysis ===
Principal component analysis (PCA) was one of the earliest methods used for pump–probe data analysis, as it is commonly used for hyperspectral data analysis. PCA decomposes the data into orthogonal components. In melanoma studies, the principal components have shown good agreement with the signals obtained from the different forms of melanin. An advantage of PCA is that noise can be reduced by keeping only the principal components that account for majority of the variance in the data. However, the principal components do not necessarily reflect actual properties of the underlying chemical species, which are typically non-orthogonal. Therefore, a limitation is that the number of unique chemical species cannot be inferred using PCA.

=== Phasor analysis ===
Phasor analysis is commonly used for fluorescence-lifetime imaging microscopy (FLIM) data analysis and has been adapted for pump–probe imaging data analysis. Signals are decomposed into their real and imaginary parts of the Fourier transform at a given frequency. By plotting the real and imaginary parts against one another, the distribution of different chromophores with distinct lifetimes can be mapped. In melanoma studies, this approach has again shown to be able to distinguish between the different forms of melanin. One of the main advantages of phasor analysis is that it provides an intuitive qualitative, graphical view of the content It has also been combined with PCA for quantitative analysis.

== Applications ==
The development of high-speed and high-sensitivity pump–probe imaging techniques has enabled applications in several fields, such as materials science, biology, and art.

=== Materials science ===
Pump–probe imaging is ideal for the study and characterization of nanomaterials, such as graphene, nanocubes, nanowires, and a variety of semiconductors, due to their large susceptibilities but weak fluorescence. In particular, single-walled carbon nanotubes have been extensively studied and imaged with submicrometer resolution, providing details about carrier dynamics, photophysical, and photochemical properties.

=== Biology ===
The first application of the pump–probe technique in biology was in vitro imaging of stimulated emission of a dye-labelled cell. Pump–probe imaging is now widely used for melanin imaging to differentiate between the two main forms of melanin – eumelanin (brown/black) and pheomelanin (red/yellow). In melanoma, eumelanin is substantially increased. Therefore, imaging the distribution of eumelanin and pheomelanin can help to distinguish benign lesions and melanoma with high sensitivity

=== Art ===
Artwork consists of many pigments with a wide range of spectral absorption properties, which determine their color. Due to the broad spectral features of these pigments, the identification of a specific pigment in a mixture is difficult. Pump–probe imaging can provide accurate, high-resolution, molecular information and distinguish between pigments that may even have the same visual color.
