= Parametric process (optics) =

Interacting phenomenon between light and matter

A parametric process is an optical process in which light interacts with matter in such a way as to leave the quantum state of the material unchanged. As a direct consequence of this there can be no net transfer of energy, momentum, or angular momentum between the optical field and the physical system. In contrast a non-parametric process is a process in which any part of the quantum state of the system changes.

== Temporal characteristics ==
Because a parametric process prohibits a net change in the energy state of the system, parametric processes are "instantaneous". For example, if an atom absorbs a photon with energy E, the atom's energy increases by ΔE = E, but as a parametric process, the quantum state cannot change and thus the elevated energy state must be a temporary virtual state. By the Heisenberg Uncertainty Principle we know that ΔEΔt~ħ/2, thus the lifetime of a parametric process is roughly Δt~ħ/2ΔE, which is appreciably small for any non-zero ΔE.

== Parametric versus non-parametric processes ==
=== Linear optics ===
In a linear optical system the dielectric polarization, P, responds linearly to the presence of an electric field, E, and thus we can write

$${\mathbf P} = \varepsilon_0\chi{\mathbf E} = (n_r+in_i)^2{\mathbf E},$$

where ε_{0} is the electric constant, χ is the (complex) electric susceptibility, and n_{r}(n_{i}) is the real(imaginary) component of the refractive index of the medium. The effects of a parametric process will affect only n_{r}, whereas a nonzero value of n_{i} can only be caused by a non-parametric process.

Thus in linear optics a parametric process will act as a lossless dielectric with the following effects:

- Refraction
- Diffraction
- Elastic scattering
  - Rayleigh scattering
  - Mie scattering

Alternatively, non-parametric processes often involve loss (or gain) and give rise to:

- Absorption
- Inelastic scattering
  - Raman scattering
  - Brillouin scattering
- Various optical emission processes
  - Photoluminescence
  - Fluorescence
  - Luminescence
  - Phosphorescence

=== Nonlinear optics ===
In a nonlinear media, the dielectric polarization P responds nonlinearly to the electric field E of the light. As a parametric process is in general coherent, many parametric nonlinear processes will depend on phase matching and will usually be polarization dependent.

Sample parametric nonlinear processes:

- Second-harmonic generation (SHG), or frequency doubling, generation of light with a doubled frequency (half the wavelength)
- Third-harmonic generation (THG), generation of light with a tripled frequency (one-third the wavelength) (usually done in two steps: SHG followed by SFG of original and frequency-doubled waves)
- High harmonic generation (HHG), generation of light with frequencies much greater than the original (typically 100 to 1000 times greater)
- Sum-frequency generation (SFG), generation of light with a frequency that is the sum of two other frequencies (SHG is a special case of this)
- Difference frequency generation (DFG), generation of light with a frequency that is the difference between two other frequencies
- Optical parametric amplification (OPA), amplification of a signal input in the presence of a higher-frequency pump wave, at the same time generating an idler wave (can be considered as DFG)
- Optical parametric oscillation (OPO), generation of a signal and idler wave using a parametric amplifier in a resonator (with no signal input)
- Optical parametric generation (OPG), like parametric oscillation but without a resonator, using a very high gain instead
- Spontaneous parametric down-conversion (SPDC), the amplification of the vacuum fluctuations in the low gain regime
- Optical Kerr effect, intensity dependent refractive index
- Self-focusing
- Kerr-lens modelocking (KLM)
- Self-phase modulation (SPM), a $\chi^{(3)}$ effect
- Optical solitons
- Cross-phase modulation (XPM)
- Four-wave mixing (FWM), can also arise from other nonlinearities
- Cross-polarized wave generation (XPW), a $\chi^{(3)}$ effect in which a wave with polarization vector perpendicular to the input is generated

Sample non-parametric nonlinear processes:

- Stimulated Raman scattering
- Raman amplification
- Two-photon absorption, simultaneous absorption of two photons, transferring the energy to a single electron
- Multiphoton absorption
- Multiple photoionisation, near-simultaneous removal of many bound electrons by one photon

== See also ==
- Nonlinear optics
