= Spectral interferometry =

Spectral interferometry (SI) or frequency-domain interferometry is a linear technique used to measure optical pulses, with the condition that a reference pulse that was previously characterized is available. This technique provides information about the intensity and phase of the pulses. SI was first proposed by Claude Froehly and coworkers in the 1970s.

A known (acting as the reference) and an unknown pulse arrive at a spectrometer, with a time delay $\tau$ between them, in order to create spectral fringes. A spectrum is produced by the sum of these two pulses and, by measuring said fringes, one can retrieve the unknown pulse. If $E_{un}(\omega)$ and $E_{ref}(\omega)$ are the electric fields of the unknown and reference pulse respectively, the time delay can be expressed as a phase factor $e^{-i\omega \tau}$ for the unknown pulses. Then, the combined field is:

$E_{SI}=E_{ref}(\omega)+E_{un}(\omega) e^{-i\omega \tau}$

The average spacing between fringes is inversely proportional to the time delay $\tau$. Thus, the SI signal is given by:

$S_{SI}=S_{ref}(\omega)+S_{un}(\omega)+2\sqrt{S_{ref}(\omega)}\sqrt{S_{un}(\omega)}cos[\phi_{SI}]$

where $\phi_{SI}=\phi_{un}(\omega)-\phi_{ref}(\omega)+\omega \tau$ is the oscillation phase.

Furthermore, the spectral fringes width can provide information on the spectral phase difference between the two pulses $\Delta \phi = \phi_{un}(\omega) -\phi_{ref}(\omega)$; narrowly spaced fringes indicate rapid phase changes with frequency.

== Comparison with the Time Domain ==
Compared to time-domain interferometry, SI presents some interesting advantages. Firstly, by using a CCD detector or a simple camera, the whole interferogram can be recorded simultaneously. Furthermore, the interferogram is not nullified by small fluctuations of the optical path, but reduction in the fringe contrast should be expected in cases of exposure time being bigger than the fluctuation time scale. However, SI produces phase measurements through its cosine only, meaning that results arise for phase differences in multiples of $2\pi$ which can lead to solutions that degrade the signal-to-noise ratio.

There have been efforts to measure pulse intensity and phase in both the time and the frequency domain by combining the autocorrelation and the spectrum. This technique is called Temporal Information Via Intensity (TIVI) and it involves an iterative algorithm to find an intensity consistent with the autocorrelation, followed by another iterative algorithm to find the temporal and spectral phases consistent with the intensity and spectrum, but the results are inconclusive.

== Applications ==
Spectral Interferometry has gained momentum in recent years. It is frequently used for measuring the linear response of materials, such as the thickness and refractive index of normal dispersive materials, the amplitude and phase of the electric field in semiconductor nanostructures and the group delay on laser mirrors.

In the realm of femtosecond spectroscopy, SI is the technique on which SPIDER is based, thus it is used for four-wave mixing experiments and various phase-resolved pump-probe experiments.

== Experimental Difficulties ==
This technique is not commonly used since it relies on a number of factors in order to obtain strong fringes during experimental processes. Some of them include:

- Precision in mode-matching
- Phase stability
- Perfectly collinear beams

== Spectral Shearing Interferometry ==
In cases of relatively long pulses, one can opt for Spectral Shearing Interferometry. For this method, the reference pulse is obtained by sending its mirror image through a sinusoidal phase modulation. Hence, a spectral shift of magnitude $\delta \omega$ can be correlated to the produced linear temporal phase modulation and the spectrum of the combined pulses then has a modulation phase of:

$\phi(\omega)= \phi_{ref}(\omega +\delta \omega)+ \omega \tau = \frac{\partial \phi_{ref}}{\partial \omega}\delta \omega +\omega \tau$

where the approximate relation is appropriate for small enough $\delta \omega$. Thus, the spectral derivative of the phase of the signal pulse which corresponds to the frequency-dependent group delay can be obtained.

== Spectral Phase Interferometry for Direct Electric-field Reconstruction ==
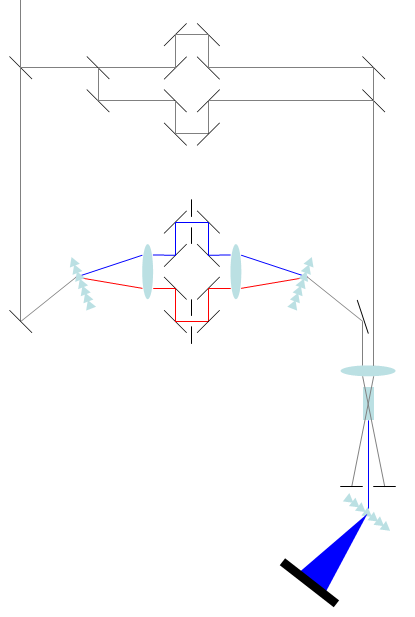
SPIDER set-up

Spectral Phase Interferometry for Direct Electric-field Reconstruction (SPIDER) is a nonlinear self-referencing technique based on spectral shearing interferometry. For this method, the reference pulse should produce a mirror image of itself with a spectral shift, in order to provide the spectral intensity and phase of the probe pulse via a direct Fast Fourier Transform (FFT) filtering routine. However, unlike SI, in order to produce the probe pulse phase, it requires phase integration extracted from the interferogram.

== Self-Referenced Spectral Interferometry ==
Self-Referenced Spectral Interferometry (SRSI) is a technique where the reference pulse is self created from the unknown pulse. The self referencing is possible due to pulse shaping optimization and non-linear temporal filtering. It provides all the benefits associated with SI (high sensitivity, precision and resolution, dynamic and large temporal range) but, unlike the SPIDER technique, neither shear nor harmonic generation are necessary in order to be implemented.

For SRSI, the generation of a weak mirror image of the unknown pulse is required. That image is perpendicularly polarized and delayed with respect to the input pulse. Then, in order to filter the reference pulse in the time domain, the main portion of the pulse is used for cross-polarized wave generation (XPW) in a nonlinear crystal. The interference between the reference pulse and the mirror image is recorded and analyzed via Fourier transform spectral interferometry (FTSI). Known applications of the SRSI technique include the characterization of pulses below 15 fs.

== Frequency-Resolved Optical Gating ==
Frequency Resolved Optical Gating (FROG) is a technique that determines the intensity and phase of a pulse by measuring the spectrum of a particular temporal component of said pulse. This results in an intensity trace, related to the spectrogram of the pulse $S_E (\omega, \tau)$, versus frequency and delay:

$S_E (\omega , \tau) = \left\vert \int \limits_{-\infty }^{\infty} E(t)g(t- \tau )e^{-i\omega }dt \right\vert^2$

where $g(t - \tau )$ is a variable-delay gate pulse. FROG is commonly combined with Second Harmonic Generation (SHG) process (SHG-FROG).

But the same principle can be applied exploiting different physical process, like polarization-gated FROG (PG-FROG) or transient-grating FROG (TG-FROG).

== Other Linear Techniques ==
There is a variety of linear techniques that are based on the main principles of spectral interferometry. Some of them are listed below.

Dual-Quadrature Spectral Interferometry
The acquisition of the two quadratures of the interference signal resolves the issue generated by the phase differences being expressed in multiples of $2\pi$. The acquisition should happen simultaneously via polarization multiplexing, with the reference beam under circular polarization.

Fourier-Transform Spectral Interferometry
It is a technique created for direct determination of $\Delta \phi$, mainly used for femtosecond pump-probe experiments in materials with long dephasing times. It is based on the inverse Fourier transform of the signal: $F.T.^{-1}_{SI}(t)=E^{\ast}_{ref}(-t) \otimes E_{ref}(t) + E^{\ast}_{un}(-t) \otimes E_{un}(t) + f(t- \tau ) + f(-t- \tau )^{\ast}$
