= Femtosecond pulse shaping =

In optics, femtosecond pulse shaping refers to manipulations with temporal profile of an ultrashort laser pulse. Pulse shaping can be used to shorten/elongate the duration of optical pulse, or to generate complex pulses.

== Introduction ==
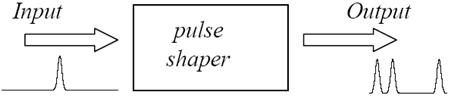
Fig. 1: Schematic diagram of a pulse shaper

Generation of sequences of ultrashort optical pulses is key in realizing ultra high speed optical networks, Optical Code Division Multiple Access (OCDMA) systems, chemical and biological reaction triggering and monitoring etc. Based on the requirement, pulse shapers may be designed to stretch, compress or produce a train of pulses from a single input pulse. The ability to produce trains of pulses with femtosecond or picosecond separation implies transmission of optical information at very high speeds.

In ultrafast laser science pulse shapers are often used as a complement to pulse compressors in order to fine-tune high-order dispersion compensation and achieve transform-limited few-cycle optical pulses.

== Techniques ==
A pulse shaper may be visualized as a modulator. The input pulse is multiplied with a modulating function to get a desired output pulse. The modulating function in pulse shapers may be in time domain or a frequency domain (obtained by Fourier transform of time profile of pulse). However, application of direct pulse shaping technique on a femtosecond time scale faces the same problem as direct femtosecond pulse measurement: electronics speed limitations. Michelson interferometer can be regarded as direct space-to-time pulse shaper since position of the moving mirror is directly transferred to the inter-pulse delay of the output pulse pair.

=== Fourier transform pulse shaping ===
An ultrashort pulse with a well-defined electrical field $E(t)$ can be modified with an appropriate filter acting in the frequency domain. Mathematically, the pulse is Fourier transformed, filtered, and back-transformed to yield a new pulse:

$$E'(t)=\mathcal{F}^{-1}\{\mathcal{F}\{E(t)\}(\omega)f(\omega)\}(t).$$

It is possible to design an optical setup with an arbitrary filter function $f(\omega)$ which can be complex-valued, as long as $|f(\omega)| \le 1$.

== Design ==
One can distinguish Fourier transform pulse shapers by their optical design: i.e., collinear shapers and transverse shapers, and by their programmability, i.e., static (or manually adjustable) shapers and programmable shapers.

== Examples ==
- Collinear static: propagation in dispersive medium, chirped mirror
- Collinear programmable: AOPDF
- Transverse static: pulse stretcher/compressor (static mask in Fourier plane can be added for amplitude shaping)
- Transverse programmable: spatial light modulator inserted in a zero-dispersion line

== See also ==
- Multiphoton intrapulse interference phase scan (MIIPS), a method to characterize and manipulate the ultrashort pulse
- Acousto-optic programmable dispersive filter (AOPDF), a collinear-beam acousto-optic modulator capable of shaping spectral phase and amplitude of ultrashort laser pulses
- Chirped mirror
