= Light valve =

A light valve (LV) is a device for varying the quantity of light, from a source, which reaches a target. Examples of targets are computer screen surfaces, or a wall screen in the case of a light projector.

There are two basic principles of achieving this. One is by deflecting the light on its way to the target (a reflective LV). The other method is to block the light (a transmissive LV).

The blocking method has found its way into liquid crystal displays (LCDs), video projectors and rear projection TVs. In this type of screens and projectors, the source light is first polarised by a filter in one direction and then passed on to another filter, filled with liquid crystals. By changing the voltage applied to this crystal filter, it will work as a switching polarising filter, giving different gray scales of the light coming out. The light is changed only once for each image frame. The light valve thus consists of the two polarising filters, where one has a voltage controlled switch function thanks to the properties of the liquid crystals. This type of valve is often referred to as a liquid crystal light valve.

The other principle, the reflective LV, works by either reflecting the light towards the target or deflecting it away. The portion of light that is reflected on the target decides the gray scale. This re- and deflection occurs many times a second. Should this happen at too low a frequency, the human eye and brain would perceive it as flickering, but due to sufficiently high frequency, a human will be "tricked" into viewing it as a continuum, a smooth shift in brightness. Examples of the reflective LV type are the digital micromirror device (DMD), Eidophor's oil-film based system, and the grating light valve.

== See also ==
- Femtosecond pulse shaping
- Multiphoton intrapulse interference phase scan
- Spatial light modulator
