= Ultrashort pulse =

Laser pulse with duration a picosecond (10^-12 s) or less

In optics, an ultrashort pulse, also known as an ultrafast event, is an electromagnetic pulse whose time duration is of the order of a picosecond (10^{−12} second) or less. Such pulses have a broadband optical spectrum, and can be created by mode-locked oscillators. Amplification of ultrashort pulses almost always requires the technique of chirped pulse amplification, in order to avoid damage to the gain medium of the amplifier.

They are characterized by a high peak intensity (or more correctly, irradiance) that usually leads to nonlinear interactions in various materials, including air. These processes are studied in the field of nonlinear optics.

In the specialized literature, "ultrashort" refers to the femtosecond (fs) and picosecond (ps) range, although such pulses no longer hold the record for the shortest pulses artificially generated. Indeed, x-ray pulses with durations on the attosecond time scale have been reported.

The 1999 Nobel Prize in Chemistry was awarded to Ahmed H. Zewail, for the use of ultrashort pulses to observe chemical reactions at the timescales on which they occur, opening up the field of femtochemistry. A further Nobel prize, the 2023 Nobel Prize in Physics, was also awarded for ultrashort pulses. This prize was awarded to Pierre Agostini, Ferenc Krausz, and Anne L'Huillier for the development of attosecond pulses and their ability to probe electron dynamics.

== Definition ==
A positively chirped ultrashort pulse of light in the time domain.

There is no standard definition of ultrashort pulse. Usually the attribute 'ultrashort' applies to pulses with a duration of a few tens of femtoseconds, but in a larger sense any pulse which lasts less than a few picoseconds can be considered ultrashort. The distinction between "Ultrashort" and "Ultrafast" is necessary as the speed at which the pulse propagates is a function of the index of refraction of the medium through which it travels, whereas "Ultrashort" refers to the temporal width of the pulse wavepacket.

A common example is a chirped Gaussian pulse, a wave whose field amplitude follows a Gaussian envelope and whose instantaneous phase has a frequency sweep.

=== Background ===
The real electric field corresponding to an ultrashort pulse is oscillating at an angular frequency ω_{0} corresponding to the central wavelength of the pulse. To facilitate calculations, a complex field E(t) is defined. Formally, it is defined as the analytic signal corresponding to the real field.

The central angular frequency ω_{0} is usually explicitly written in the complex field, which may be separated as a temporal intensity function I(t) and a temporal phase function ψ(t):

$$E(t) = \sqrt{I(t)}e^{i\omega_0t}e^{i\psi(t)}$$

The expression of the complex electric field in the frequency domain is obtained from the Fourier transform of E(t):

$$E(\omega) = \mathcal{F}(E(t))$$

Because of the presence of the $e^{i\omega_0t}$ term, E(ω) is centered around ω_{0}, and it is a common shorthand to refer to E(ω-ω_{0}) by writing just E(ω), which will be followed for the remainder of this article.

Just as in the time domain, an intensity and a phase function can be defined in the frequency domain:

$$E(\omega) = \sqrt{S(\omega)}e^{i\phi(\omega)}$$

The quantity $S(\omega)$ is the power spectral density (or simply, the spectrum) of the pulse, and $\phi(\omega)$ is the phase spectral density (or simply spectral phase). Example of spectral phase functions include the case where $\phi(\omega)$ is a constant, in which case the pulse is called a bandwidth-limited pulse, or where $\phi(\omega)$ is a quadratic function, in which case the pulse is called a chirped pulse because of the presence of an instantaneous frequency sweep. Such a chirp may be acquired as a pulse propagates through materials (like glass) and is due to their dispersion. It results in a temporal broadening of the pulse.

The intensity functions—temporal $I(t)$ and spectral $S(\omega)$ —determine the time duration and spectrum bandwidth of the pulse. As stated by the uncertainty principle, their product (sometimes called the time-bandwidth product) has a lower bound. This minimum value depends on the definition used for the duration and on the shape of the pulse. For a given spectrum, the minimum time-bandwidth product, and therefore the shortest pulse, is obtained by a transform-limited pulse, i.e., for a constant spectral phase $\phi(\omega)$. High values of the time-bandwidth product, on the other hand, indicate a more complex pulse.

== Pulse shape control ==
Although optical devices also used for continuous light, like beam expanders and spatial filters, may be used for ultrashort pulses, several optical devices have been specifically designed for ultrashort pulses. One of them is the pulse compressor, a device that can be used to control the spectral phase of ultrashort pulses. It is composed of a sequence of prisms, or gratings. When properly adjusted it can alter the spectral phase φ(ω) of the input pulse so that the output pulse is a bandwidth-limited pulse with the shortest possible duration. A pulse shaper can be used to make more complicated alterations on both the phase and the amplitude of ultrashort pulses.

To accurately control the pulse, a full characterization of the pulse spectral phase is a must in order to get certain pulse spectral phase (such as transform-limited). Then, a spatial light modulator can be used in the 4f plane to control the pulse. Multiphoton intrapulse interference phase scan (MIIPS) is a technique based on this concept. Through the phase scan of the spatial light modulator, MIIPS can not only characterize but also manipulate the ultrashort pulse to get the needed pulse shape at target spot (such as transform-limited pulse for optimized peak power, and other specific pulse shapes). If the pulse shaper is fully calibrated, this technique allows controlling the spectral phase of ultrashort pulses using a simple optical setup with no moving parts. However the accuracy of MIIPS is somewhat limited with respect to other techniques, such as frequency-resolved optical gating (FROG).

Another important aspect of pulse shaping is the temporal contrast of the ultrashort pulse, which are limited by a number of factors such as amplified spontaneous emission, higher-order dispersion, spectrum clipping/scattering from diffraction gratings, and other non-linear optical effects. The presence of pre-pulses that arise from poor temporal contrast generates a pre-plasma when the pulse interacts with a solid target, as in many laser plasma experiments, which prevents the ultrashort pulse from interacting with the target itself. A number of techniques were conceived to improve temporal contrast of these ultrashort, high-intensity laser pulses, including conventional instruments such as pockels cells, cross-polarized waves, as well as novel techniques such as plasma mirrors.

== Measurement techniques ==
Several techniques are available to measure ultrashort optical pulses.

Intensity autocorrelation gives the pulse width when a particular pulse shape is assumed.

Spectral interferometry (SI) is a linear technique that can be used when a pre-characterized reference pulse is available. It gives the intensity and phase. The algorithm that extracts the intensity and phase from the SI signal is direct. Spectral phase interferometry for direct electric-field reconstruction (SPIDER) is a nonlinear self-referencing technique based on spectral shearing interferometry. The method is similar to SI, except that the reference pulse is a spectrally shifted replica of itself, allowing one to obtain the spectral intensity and phase of the probe pulse via a direct FFT filtering routine similar to SI, but which requires integration of the phase extracted from the interferogram to obtain the probe pulse phase.

Frequency-resolved optical gating (FROG) is a nonlinear technique that yields the intensity and phase of a pulse. It is a spectrally resolved autocorrelation. The algorithm that extracts the intensity and phase from a FROG trace is iterative. Grating-eliminated no-nonsense observation of ultrafast incident laser light e-fields (GRENOUILLE) is a simplified version of FROG. (Grenouille is French for "frog".)

Chirp scan is a technique similar to MIIPS which measures the spectral phase of a pulse by applying a ramp of quadratic spectral phases and measuring second harmonic spectra. With respect to MIIPS, which requires many iterations to measure the spectral phase, only two chirp scans are needed to retrieve both the amplitude and the phase of the pulse.

Multiphoton intrapulse interference phase scan (MIIPS) is a method to characterize and manipulate the ultrashort pulse.

== Wave packet propagation in nonisotropic media ==
To partially reiterate the discussion above, the slowly varying envelope approximation (SVEA) of the electric field of a wave with central wave vector $\textbf{K}_0$ and central frequency $\omega_0$ of the pulse, is given by:

$$\textbf{E} ( \textbf{x} , t) = \textbf{ A } ( \textbf{x} , t) \exp ( i \textbf{K}_0 \textbf{x} - i \omega_0 t )$$

One may consider the propagation for the SVEA of the electric field in a homogeneous dispersive nonisotropic medium. Assuming the pulse is propagating in the direction of the z-axis, it can be shown that the envelope $\textbf{A}$ for one of the most general of cases, namely a biaxial crystal, is governed by the PDE:

$\frac{\partial \textbf{A} }{\partial z } = ~-~ \beta_1 \frac{\partial \textbf{A} }{\partial t} ~-~ \frac{i}{2} \beta_2 \frac{\partial^2 \textbf{A} }{\partial t^2} ~+~ \frac{1}{6} \beta_3 \frac{\partial^3 \textbf{A} }{\partial t^3} ~+~ \gamma_x \frac{\partial \textbf{A} }{\partial x} ~+~ \gamma_y \frac{\partial \textbf{A} }{\partial y}$

$$~~~~~~~~~~~
~+~ i \gamma_{tx} \frac{\partial^2 \textbf{A} }{\partial t \partial x}
~+~ i \gamma_{ty} \frac{\partial^2 \textbf{A} }{\partial t \partial y}
~-~ \frac{i}{2} \gamma_{xx} \frac{\partial^2 \textbf{A} }{ \partial x^2}
~-~ \frac{i}{2} \gamma_{yy} \frac{\partial^2 \textbf{A} }{ \partial y^2}
~+~ i \gamma_{xy} \frac{\partial^2 \textbf{A} }{ \partial x \partial y} + \cdots$$

where the coefficients contains diffraction and dispersion effects which have been determined analytically with computer algebra and verified numerically to within third order for both isotropic and non-isotropic media, valid in the near-field and far-field. $\beta_1$ is the inverse of the group velocity projection. The term in $\beta_2$ is the group velocity dispersion (GVD) or second-order dispersion; it increases the pulse duration and chirps the pulse as it propagates through the medium. The term in $\beta_3$ is a third-order dispersion term that can further increase the pulse duration, even if $\beta_2$ vanishes. The terms in $\gamma_x$ and $\gamma_y$ describe the walk-off of the pulse; the coefficient $\gamma_x ~ (\gamma_y )$ is the ratio of the component of the group velocity $x ~ (y)$ and the unit vector in the direction of propagation of the pulse (z-axis). The terms in $\gamma_{xx}$ and $\gamma_{yy}$ describe diffraction of the optical wave packet in the directions perpendicular to the axis of propagation. The terms in $\gamma_{tx}$ and $\gamma_{ty}$ containing mixed derivatives in time and space rotate the wave packet about the $y$ and $x$ axes, respectively, increase the temporal width of the wave packet (in addition to the increase due to the GVD), increase the dispersion in the $x$ and $y$ directions, respectively, and increase the chirp (in addition to that due to $\beta_2$) when the latter and/or $\gamma_{xx}$ and $\gamma_{yy}$ are nonvanishing. The term $\gamma_{xy}$ rotates the wave packet in the $x-y$ plane. Oddly enough, because of previously incomplete expansions, this rotation of the pulse was not realized until the late 1990s but it has been experimentally confirmed. To third order, the RHS of the above equation is found to have these additional terms for the uniaxial crystal case:

$$\cdots
~+~ \frac{1}{3} \gamma_{t x x } \frac{\partial^3 \textbf{A} }{ \partial x^2 \partial t}
~+~ \frac{1}{3} \gamma_{t y y } \frac{\partial^3 \textbf{A} }{ \partial y^2 \partial t}
~+~ \frac{1}{3} \gamma_{t t x } \frac{\partial^3 \textbf{A} }{ \partial t^2 \partial x} + \cdots$$

The first and second terms are responsible for the curvature of the propagating front of the pulse. These terms, including the term in $\beta_3$ are present in an isotropic medium and account for the spherical surface of a propagating front originating from a point source. The term $\gamma_{txx}$ can be expressed in terms of the index of refraction, the frequency $\omega$ and derivatives thereof and the term $\gamma_{ttx}$ also distorts the pulse but in a fashion that reverses the roles of $t$ and $x$ (see reference of Trippenbach, Scott and Band for details). So far, the treatment herein is linear, but nonlinear dispersive terms are ubiquitous to nature. Studies involving an additional nonlinear term $\gamma_{nl} |A|^2 A$ have shown that such terms have a profound effect on wave packet, including amongst other things, a self-steepening of the wave packet. The non-linear aspects eventually lead to optical solitons.

Despite being rather common, the SVEA is not required to formulate a simple wave equation describing the propagation of optical pulses. In fact, as shown in, even a very general form of the electromagnetic second order wave equation can be factorized into directional components, providing access to a single first order wave equation for the field itself, rather than an envelope. This requires only an assumption that the field evolution is slow on the scale of a wavelength, and does not restrict the bandwidth of the pulse at all—as demonstrated vividly by.

== High harmonics ==
High energy ultrashort pulses can be generated through high harmonic generation in a nonlinear medium. A high intensity ultrashort pulse will generate an array of harmonics in the medium; a particular harmonic of interest is then selected with a monochromator. This technique has been used to produce ultrashort pulses in the extreme ultraviolet and soft-X-ray regimes from near infrared Ti-sapphire laser pulses.

== Applications ==
=== Advanced material 3D micro-/nano-processing ===
The ability of femtosecond lasers to efficiently fabricate complex structures and devices for a wide variety of applications has been extensively studied during the last decade. State-of-the-art laser processing techniques with ultrashort light pulses can be used to structure materials with a sub-micrometer resolution. Direct laser writing (DLW) of suitable photoresists and other transparent media can create intricate three-dimensional photonic crystals (PhC), micro-optical components, gratings, tissue engineering (TE) scaffolds and optical waveguides. Such structures are potentially useful for empowering next-generation applications in telecommunications and bioengineering that rely on the creation of increasingly sophisticated miniature parts. The precision, fabrication speed and versatility of ultrafast laser processing make it well placed to become a vital industrial tool for manufacturing.

=== Micro-machining ===
Among the applications of femtosecond laser, the microtexturization of implant surfaces have been experimented for the enhancement of the bone formation around zirconia dental implants. The technique demonstrated to be precise with a very low thermal damage and with the reduction of the surface contaminants. Posterior animal studies demonstrated that the increase on the oxygen layer and the micro and nanofeatures created by the microtexturing with femtosecond laser resulted in higher rates of bone formation, higher bone density and improved mechanical stability.

== See also ==
- Attosecond chronoscopy
- Bandwidth-limited pulse
- Femtochemistry
- Frequency comb
- Medical imaging: Ultrashort laser pulses are used in multiphoton fluorescence microscopes
- Optical communication (Ultrashort pulses) Filtering and Pulse Shaping.
- Terahertz (T-rays) generation and detection.
- Ultrafast laser spectroscopy
- Ultrashort pulse laser
- Wave packet
