= Acousto-optic programmable dispersive filter =

An acousto-optic programmable dispersive filter (AOPDF) is a special type of collinear-beam acousto-optic modulator capable of shaping spectral phase and amplitude of ultrashort laser pulses. AOPDF was invented by Pierre Tournois. Typically, quartz crystals are used for the fabrication of the AOPDFs operating in the UV spectral domain, paratellurite crystals are used in the visible and the NIR (up to 4 μm) and calomel in the MIR (3–20 μm). Recently introduced lithium niobate crystals allow for high-repetition rate operation (> 100 kHz) owing to their high acoustic velocity. The AOPDF is also used for the active control of the carrier-envelope phase of few-cycle optical pulses, as a part of pulse-measurement schemes and multi-dimensional spectroscopy techniques. Although sharing a lot in principle of operation with an acousto-optic tunable filter, the AOPDF should not be confused with it, since in the former the tunable parameter is the transfer function and in the latter it is the impulse response.

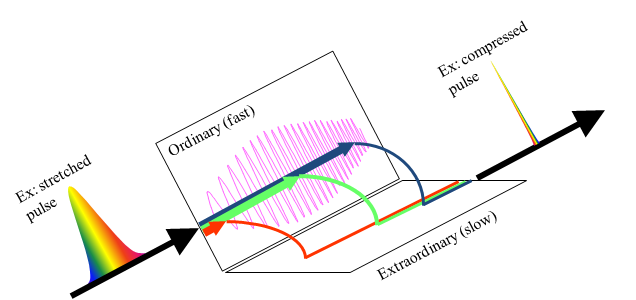
Image illustrating the principle of spectral phase and amplitude shaping by an acousto-optic programmable dispersive filter.

== Theory of operation ==
Traveling acoustic wave induces variations in optical properties, thus forming a dynamic volume grating.

== Pulse shaping ==
AOPDF is a programmable spectral filter. From signal processing point of view, the AOPDF corresponds to a time-variant passive linear transversal filter with a programmable finite impulse response. Phase and amplitude filtering in the AOPDF is achieved by virtue of birefringent acousto-optic effect and can be represented by a convolution between the amplitude of the input optical signal E_{in}(t) and a programmable acoustical signal S(t/α) proportional to the electrical signal S(t) applied to the Piezoelectric transducer (made typically from lithium niobate). Here, α is a scaling factor equal to the ratio of the speed of sound v to the speed of light c times the index difference Δn between the ordinary and the extraordinary waves taken along the propagation axis in the crystal. In the limit of low diffraction efficiency the AOPDF behaves as a linear filter and the small value of the α (typically 10^{−7}) allows for the quantitative control of optical signals with frequencies of tens to hundreds of terahertz with electrical signals of tens of megahertz, which are readily produced by commercial waveform generators.

=== Polarization ===
Owing to its birefringent nature, the AOPDF is intrinsically polarization-sensitive. Furthermore, polarization of the diffracted wave, created as the result of the interaction between the incident optical wave and the acoustic wave in the crystal, is rotated by 90° with respect to the incident wave polarization. For the single-beam optical input there could be up to 4 beams at the output of the AOPDF: two transmitted (non-diffracted) beams arising from double refraction and (in the presence of a suitable acoustic wave in the crystal) two diffracted beams corresponding to each linear polarization component (ordinary and extraordinary) of the input beam. Typically, an ordinary-polarized beam is used at the input and so, only two beams are observed at the output: an ordinary-polarized transmitted beam and an extraordinary-polarized diffracted beam.

=== Diffraction efficiency ===
Spectral intensity of the diffracted wave depends on the spectral intensity of the acoustic wave (which depends, in turn, on the RF power applied to the transducer). Ratio between the diffracted intensity and the input one represents the diffraction efficiency. Maximum diffraction efficiency is limited by nonlinear effects. Linear regime persists up to diffraction efficiencies of about 50%. Total efficiency is altered by Fresnel losses at the input and output faces of the crystal unless anti-reflection coating is used.

=== Spectral bandwidth ===
Spectral bandwidth of the AOPDF is defined as a range over which the device can operate. One can distinguish intrinsic bandwidth, which is limited by absorption of the acousto-optic crystal, total device bandwidth, limited by impedance matching between the piezoelectric transducer and the radio-frequency generator, and instantaneous bandwidth defined by maximal simultaneous spectral width diffracted with reasonable efficiency.

== See also ==
- Femtosecond pulse shaping
- Pulse shape control
- Spatial light modulator
