= Cross-phase modulation =

Cross-phase modulation (XPM) is a nonlinear optical effect where one wavelength of light can affect the phase of another wavelength of light through the optical Kerr effect. When the optical power from a wavelength impacts the refractive index, the impact of the new refractive index on another wavelength is known as XPM.

== Applications of XPM ==
Cross-phase modulation can be used as a technique for adding information to a light stream by modifying the phase of a coherent optical beam with another beam through interactions in an appropriate nonlinear medium. This technique is applied to fiber-optic communications. If both beams have the same wavelength, then this type of cross-phase modulation is degenerate.

XPM is among the most commonly used techniques for quantum nondemolition measurements.

Other advantageous applications of XPM include:

- Nonlinear optical Pulse Compression of ultrashort pulses
- Passive mode-locking
- Ultrafast optical switching
- Demultiplexing of OTDM channels
- Wavelength conversion of WDM channels
- Measurement of nonlinear optical properties of the media (non-linear index n_{2} (Kerr nonlinearity) and nonlinear response relaxation time)

== Disadvantages of XPM ==
=== XPM in DWDM applications ===
In dense wavelength-division multiplexing (DWDM) applications with intensity modulation and direct detection (IM-DD), the effect of XPM is a two step process: First the signal is phase modulated by the copropagating second signal. In a second step dispersion leads to a transformation of the phase modulation into a power variation. Additionally, the dispersion results in a walk-off between the channels and thereby reduces the effect of XPM.

- XPM leads to interchannel crosstalk in WDM systems
- It can produce amplitude and timing jitter

== See also ==
- Self-phase modulation — SPM
- Four wave mixing — FWM
- Stimulated Raman scattering — SRS
- Cross-polarized wave generation — XPW
