= Femtochemistry =

Chemistry of reactions on 10^-15 second timescales

Pump-probe techniques

Femtochemistry is the area of physical chemistry that studies chemical reactions on extremely short timescales (approximately 10^{−15} seconds or one femtosecond, hence the name) in order to study the very act of atoms within molecules (reactants) rearranging themselves to form new molecules (products). In a 1988 issue of the journal Science, Ahmed Hassan Zewail published an article using this term for the first time, stating "Real-time femtochemistry, that is, chemistry on the femtosecond timescale...". Later in 1999, Zewail received the Nobel Prize in Chemistry for his pioneering work in this field showing that it is possible to see how atoms in a molecule move during a chemical reaction with flashes of laser light.

Application of femtochemistry in biological studies has also helped to elucidate the conformational dynamics of stem-loop RNA structures.

Many publications have discussed the possibility of controlling chemical reactions by this method, but this remains controversial. The steps in some reactions occur in the femtosecond timescale and sometimes in attosecond timescales, and will sometimes form intermediate products. These reaction intermediates cannot always be deduced from observing the start and end products.

== Pump–probe spectroscopy ==
The simplest approach and still one of the most common techniques is known as pump–probe spectroscopy. In this method, two or more optical pulses with variable time delay between them are used to investigate the processes happening during a chemical reaction. The first pulse (pump) initiates the reaction, by breaking a bond or exciting one of the reactants. The second pulse (probe) is then used to interrogate the progress of the reaction a certain period of time after initiation. As the reaction progresses, the response of the reacting system to the probe pulse will change. By continually scanning the time delay between pump and probe pulses and observing the response, workers can reconstruct the progress of the reaction as a function of time.

== Examples ==
=== Bromine dissociation ===
Femtochemistry has been used to show the time-resolved electronic stages of bromine dissociation. When dissociated by a 400 nm laser pulse, electrons completely localize onto individual atoms after 140 fs, with Br atoms separated by 6.0 Å after 160 fs.

== See also ==
- Attosecond physics (1 attosecond = 10^{−18} s)
- Femtotechnology
- Ultrafast laser spectroscopy
- Ultrashort pulse
- Flash photolysis
