= Chirped mirror =

Dielectric mirror

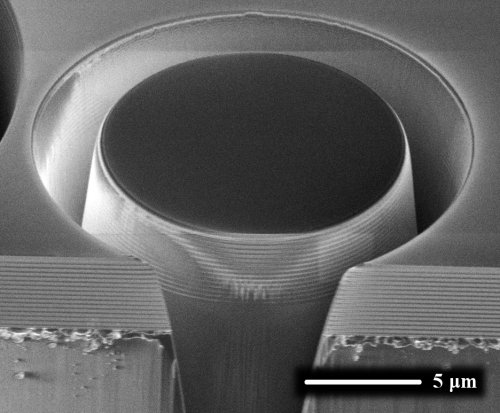
A non-chirped dielectric mirror. This electron microscope image of a tiny circular piece of dielectric mirror being cut out from a larger substrate clearly shows the periodic layered structure of the mirror. The spacing of each layer determines the wavelength of light that is reflected by that layer. In a chirped dielectric mirror the deeper layers would be thicker than the surface layers to reflect longer wavelengths of light and create the chirped effect.

A chirped mirror is a dielectric mirror with chirped spaces—spaces of varying depth designed to reflect varying wavelengths of lights—between the dielectric layers (stack).

Chirped mirrors are used in applications like lasers to reflect a wider range of light wavelengths than ordinary dielectric mirrors, or to compensate for the dispersion of wavelengths that can be created by some optical elements. Chirped mirrors are also found in structurally colored biological systems, including the shiny golden and silver color of certain beetles' elytra, e.g. those of the Ruteline genus Chrysina. In these cases, the chirped mirror generates complex color (such as gold or silver) when illuminated by white light by simultaneously reflecting a broad range of monochromatic colors.

== Simple explanation ==
An ordinary dielectric mirror is made to reflect a single frequency of light. The dielectric mirror is made of transparent materials that are uniformly layered at a depth of 1/4 the wavelength of light the dielectric mirror is designed to reflect. In addition, the amplitude reflection coefficients for the interfaces have alternating signs, hence all reflected components from the interfaces interfere constructively, which results in a strong reflection for the designed wavelength. The dielectric mirror is transparent to other wavelengths of light except those in a very narrow band around the wavelength it is designed to reflect.

A chirped mirror is made to reflect a wider range of frequencies. This is done by creating layers with different depths. There may be 10 layers with a depth designed to reflect a certain wavelength of light, another 10 layers with slightly greater depth to reflect a slightly longer wavelength of light, and so on for the entire range of wavelengths of light the mirror is designed to reflect. The result is a mirror that can reflect a whole range of light wavelengths rather than single narrow band of wavelengths.

Because light reflected from the deeper layers of the mirror travels a longer distance than the light that reflects off the surface layers, a chirped mirror can be designed to change the relative times of wavefronts of different wavelength reflecting from it. This may be used, for example, to disperse a pulse of light of different wavelengths that arrives all at one time or to tighten a pulse of light where different wavelengths arrive dispersed in time.

This ability to tighten or more tightly pack a pulse of light of different wavelengths is important, because some commonly used optical elements naturally disperse a packet of light according to wavelength, a phenomenon known as chromatic dispersion. A chirped mirror can be designed to compensate for the chromatic dispersion created by other optical elements in a system.

This is a simplified explanation and omits some important but more complex technical considerations.

== Technical explanation ==
For dielectric mirrors, materials with a refractive index between approx. 1.5 and 2.2 are available. The amplitude of the Fresnel reflection is about 0.2. With 10 layers about 0.99 of the light amplitude (that is, 0.98 of the light intensity) is reflected. So if a given chirped mirror has 60 layers, light of a specific frequency interacts only with one sixth of the whole stack.

Reflection from the first surface amounts to an early reflection with unaltered chirp. This is prevented by sparing some layers for anti-reflective coating. In a simple case this is done with a single layer of MgF_{2} (which has a refractive index of 1.38 in the near infrared). The bandwidth is large, but not one octave. As the incidence varies from normal to Brewster's angle, p-polarized light is less and less reflected. To eliminate residual reflections from the surface in the case of multiple mirrors, the distance between the surface and the stack is different for every mirror.

Naively one would think that the chirp starts outside the desired wavelength range, and any wavelength within the range experiences a complete resonance fade in and fade out. A detailed calculation (references in the external link) shows that the reflectivity of the mirror must also be chirped, which can be done by allotting the half-wavelength unequally across the high- and low-index zones. These are called double-chirped mirrors.

== Application ==
In Ti-sapphire lasers employing Kerr-lens modelocking, chirped mirrors are often used as the sole means to compensate group delay variations. Considering the above numbers a single mirror can compensate 4 μm optical path length. Considering the group velocity this is enough for the 3 m air inside the cavity, for the 3 mm of Ti:sapphire crystal three more mirrors are needed, so that a simple Z-cavity can already be compensated.

On the other hand, the gain of the crystal of about 1.1, which is high enough to compensate the loss of 8 mirrors, which gives more degrees of freedom in group delay compensation. More critically for short pulses is that the frequency components outside the gain range of the crystal generated indirectly by self-phase modulation are not lost through the end or folding mirrors but are transmitted through the out-couple mirror. In a kind of decision by majority the modes of the laser decide which group delay to choose, and spectral components close to this delay are emphasized in the output. Due to the ripples in the compensation, the spectrum also has ripples.

A single stack reflects between 780 nm and 800 nm. The chirped mirror with 6 times the layers can be reflective from 730 nm to 850 nm. The gain of Ti:Sa is greater than one between 600 nm and 1200 nm. To reflect this bandwidth higher losses have to be accepted. In Chirped pulse amplification these mirrors are used to correct residual variations of group delay after a grating compressor is inserted into the system.

== Biological ==
The scarab beetle species Chrysina limbata reflects close to 97% of light across the visible wavelength range. This is achieved with chirped mirror made of layers of chitin. Its chitin exoskeleton consists of many layers, the thickness of each layer changes with depth, which changes the optical path-length, and produces a chirped mirror. Each chirped layer is tuned to a different wavelength of light.
