= Kerr-lens modelocking =

Laser mode-locking method

Kerr-lens mode-locking (KLM) is a method of mode-locking lasers via the nonlinear optical Kerr effect. This method allows the generation of pulses of light with a duration as short as a few femtoseconds.

The optical Kerr effect is a process which results from the nonlinear response of an optical medium to the electric field of an electromagnetic wave. The refractive index of the medium is dependent on the field strength.

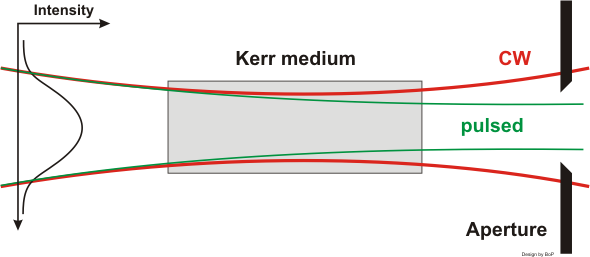
Hard aperture Kerr-lens modelocking principle

Soft aperture Kerr-lens modelocking. Within crystal from inside to outside: Green=pump, blue=pulsed light, red=continuous waves

Because of the non-uniform power density distribution in a Gaussian beam (as found in laser resonators) the refractive index changes across the beam profile; the refractive index experienced by the beam is greater in the center of the beam than at the edge. Thus a rod of an active Kerr medium functions as a lens for high intensity light. This is called self-focusing and in extreme cases leads to material destruction. In the laser cavity short bursts of light will then be focused differently from continuous waves.

To favor the pulsed mode over continuous-wave, the cavity could be made unstable for continuous-wave operation, but more often a low stability is a by-product of a cavity design putting emphasis on aperture effects. Older designs used a hard aperture, that simply cuts off, while modern designs use a soft aperture, that means the overlap between the pumped region of the gain medium and the pulse. While the effect of a lens on a free laser beam is quite obvious, inside a cavity the whole beam tries to adapt to this change. The standard cavity with flat mirrors and a thermal lens in the laser crystal has the smallest beam width on the end-mirrors. With the additional Kerr lens the width on the end-mirror gets even smaller. Therefore, small end-mirrors (hard aperture) favor pulses. In Ti:Sapphire oscillators telescopes are inserted around the crystal to increase the intensity.

For a soft aperture consider an infinite laser crystal with a thermal lens. A laser beam is guided like in a glass fiber. With an additional Kerr lens the beam width gets smaller. In a real laser the crystal is finite. The cavity on both sides features a concave mirror and then a relative long path to a flat mirror. The continuous-wave light exits the crystal end face with a larger beam width and slight divergence. It illuminates a smaller area on the concave mirror, leading to a small beam-width on the way to the flat mirror. Thus diffraction is stronger. Because of the divergence the light is effectively coming from a point farther apart and leads to more convergence after the concave mirror. This convergence is balanced with diffraction. The pulsed light exits the end face with a smaller beam width and no divergence. Thus it illuminates a larger area on the concave mirror and is less convergent afterwards. So both continuous waves and pulsed light fronts are mirrored back onto themselves. A cavity close to a confocal one means to be close to instability, which means the beam diameter is sensitive to cavity changes. This emphasizes the modulation. With a slightly asymmetric cavity prolonging the cavity emphasizes diffraction and even makes it unstable for continuous-wave operation, while staying stable for pulsed operation.

The length of the medium used for KLM is limited by group velocity dispersion. KLM is used in Carrier envelope offset control.

== Starting a Kerr-lens modelocked laser ==
Initiation of Kerr-lens modelocking depends on the strength of the nonlinear effect involved. If the laser field builds up in a cavity the laser has to overcome the region of continuous-wave operation, which often is favoured by the pumping mechanism. This can be achieved by a very strong Kerr-lensing that is strong enough to modelock due to small changes of the laser field strength (laser field build-up or stochastic fluctuations).

Modelocking can also be started by shifting the optimum focus from the continuous-wave operation to pulsed operation while changing the power density by kicking the end mirror of the resonator cavity (though a piezo mounted, synchronous oscillating end-mirror would be more 'turn key'). Other principles involve different nonlinear effects like saturable absorbers and saturable Bragg reflectors, which induce pulses short enough to initiate the Kerr-lensing process.

== Modelocking – evolution of the pulse ==
Intensity changes with lengths of nanoseconds are amplified by the Kerr-lensing process and the pulselength further shrinks to achieve higher field strengths in the center of the pulse. This sharpening process is only limited by the bandwidth achievable with the laser material and the cavity-mirrors as well as the dispersion of the cavity. The shortest pulse achievable with a given spectrum is called the bandwidth-limited pulse.

Chirped mirror technology allows to compensate for timing mismatch of different wavelengths inside the cavity due to material dispersion while keeping the stability high and the losses low.

The Kerr effect leads to the Kerr-lens and Self-phase modulation at the same time. To a first approximation it is possible to consider them as independent effects.

== Applications ==
Since Kerr-lens modelocking is an effect that directly reacts on the electric field, the response time is fast enough to produce light pulses in the visible and near infrared with lengths of less than 5 femtoseconds. Due to the high electrical field strength focused ultrashort laser beams can overcome the threshold of 10^{14} W cm^{−2}, which surpasses the field strength of the electron-ion bond in atoms.

These short pulses open the new field of ultrafast optics, which is a field of nonlinear optics that gives access to a completely new class of phenomena like measurement of electron movements in an atom (attosecond phenomena), coherent broadband light generation (ultrabroad lasers) and thereby gives rise to many new applications in optical sensing (e.g. coherent laser radar, ultrahigh resolution optical coherence tomography), material processing and other fields like metrology (extremely exact frequency and time measurements).

== References and notes ==
1. D. E. Spence, P. N. Kean, and W. Sibbett, Opt. Lett. 16, 42(1991).
2. M. Piche, Opt. Commun. 86, 156(1991).
3. B. Proctor, E. Westwig, and F. Wise, Opt. Lett. 18, 1654(1993).
4. V. Magni, G. Cerullo, and S. De Silvestri, Opt. Commun. 101, 365(1993).
