= Titanium-sapphire laser =

Type of laser

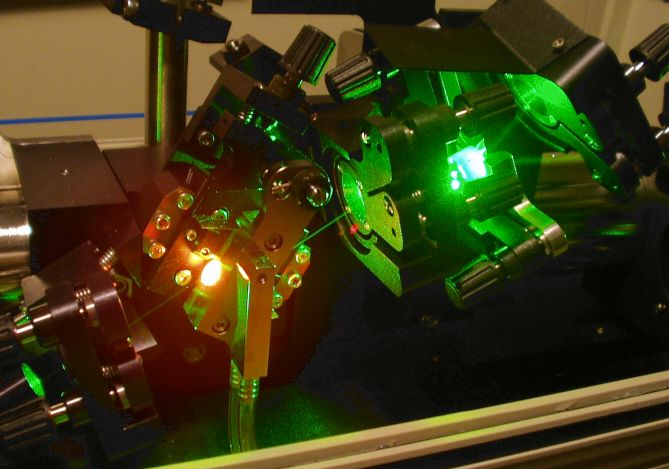
Part of a Ti:sapphire oscillator. The Ti:sapphire crystal is the bright red light source on the left. The green light is from the pump diode.

A titanium-sapphire laser (also known as a Ti:sapphire laser, Ti:Al_{2}O_{3} laser or Ti:sapph) is a tunable laser which emits red and near-infrared light in the range from 650 to 1100 nanometers. This type of laser is mainly used in scientific research because of its tunability and its ability to generate ultrashort pulses, thanks to its broad light emission spectrum. Lasers based on Ti:sapphire were first constructed and invented in June 1982 by Peter Moulton at the MIT Lincoln Laboratory.

Titanium-sapphire refers to the lasing medium, a crystal of sapphire (Al_{2}O_{3}) that is doped with Ti^{3+} ions. A Ti:sapphire laser is usually pumped with another laser with a wavelength of 514 to 532 nm, for which argon-ion lasers (514.5 nm) and frequency-doubled Nd:YAG, Nd:YLF, and Nd:YVO lasers (527–532 nm) are used. They are capable of laser operation from 670 nm to 1,100 nm wavelength. Ti:sapphire lasers operate most efficiently at wavelengths near 800 nm. The crystal is often made using the heat exchanger method of production.

== Types ==
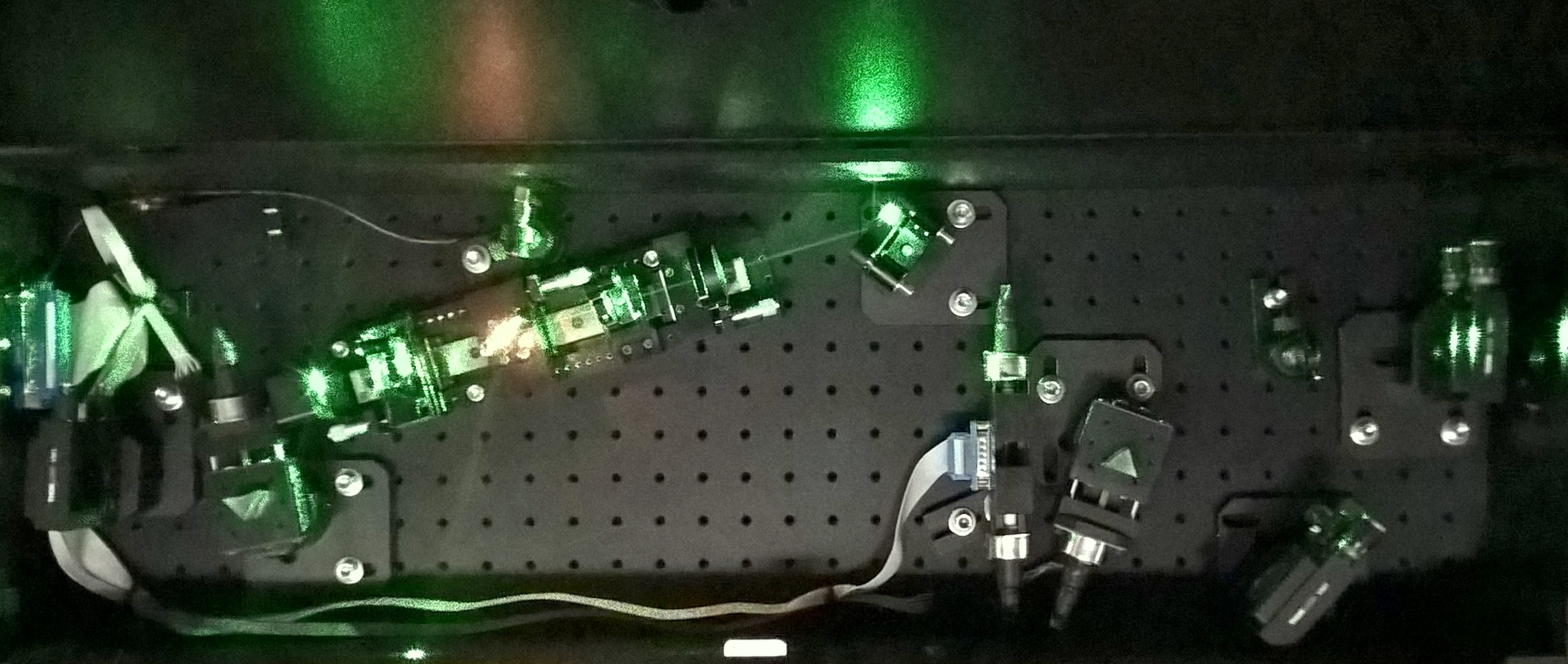
The inner optical setup of a femtosecond Ti-sapphire pulsed laser

=== Mode-locked oscillators ===
Mode-locked oscillators generate ultrashort pulses with a typical duration between a few picoseconds and 10 femtoseconds, in special cases even around 5 femtoseconds (few carrier wave cycles in each laser pulses). The pulse repetition frequency is in most cases around 70 to 90 MHz, as given by the oscillator's round-trip optical path, typically a few meters. Ti:sapphire oscillators are normally pumped with a continuous-wave laser beam from an argon or frequency-doubled Nd:YVO4 laser. Typically, such an oscillator has an average output power of 0.4 to 2.5 watts (5.7 to 35 nJ in each laser pulse for the 70 MHz repetition rate).

=== Chirped-pulse amplifiers ===
These devices generate ultrashort, ultra-high-intensity pulses with a duration of 20 to 100 femtoseconds. A typical one stage amplifier can produce pulses of up to 5 millijoules in energy at a repetition frequency of 1000 hertz, while a larger, multistage facility can produce pulses up to several joules, with a repetition rate of up to 10 Hz. Usually, amplifier crystals are pumped with a pulsed frequency-doubled Nd:YLF laser at 527 nm and operate at 800 nm. Two different designs exist for the amplifier: regenerative amplifier and multi-pass amplifier.

Regenerative amplifiers operate by amplifying single pulses from an oscillator (see above). Instead of a normal cavity with a partially reflective mirror, they contain high-speed optical switches that insert a pulse into a cavity and take the pulse out of the cavity exactly at the right moment when it has been amplified to a high intensity.

The term 'chirped-pulse' refers to a special construction that is necessary to prevent the pulse from damaging the components in the laser. The pulse is stretched in time so that the energy is not all located at the same point in time and space. This prevents damage to the optics in the amplifier. Then the pulse is optically amplified and recompressed in time to form a short, localized pulse. All optics after this point should be chosen to take the high energy density into consideration.

In a multi-pass amplifier, there are no optical switches. Instead, mirrors guide the beam a fixed number of times (two or more) through the Ti:sapphire crystal with slightly different directions. A pulsed pump beam can also be multi-passed through the crystal, so that more and more passes pump the crystal. First the pump beam pumps a spot in the gain medium. Then the signal beam first passes through the center for maximal amplification, but in later passes the diameter is increased to stay below the damage-threshold, to avoid amplification the outer parts of the beam, thus increasing beam quality and cutting off some amplified spontaneous emission and to completely deplete the inversion in the gain medium.

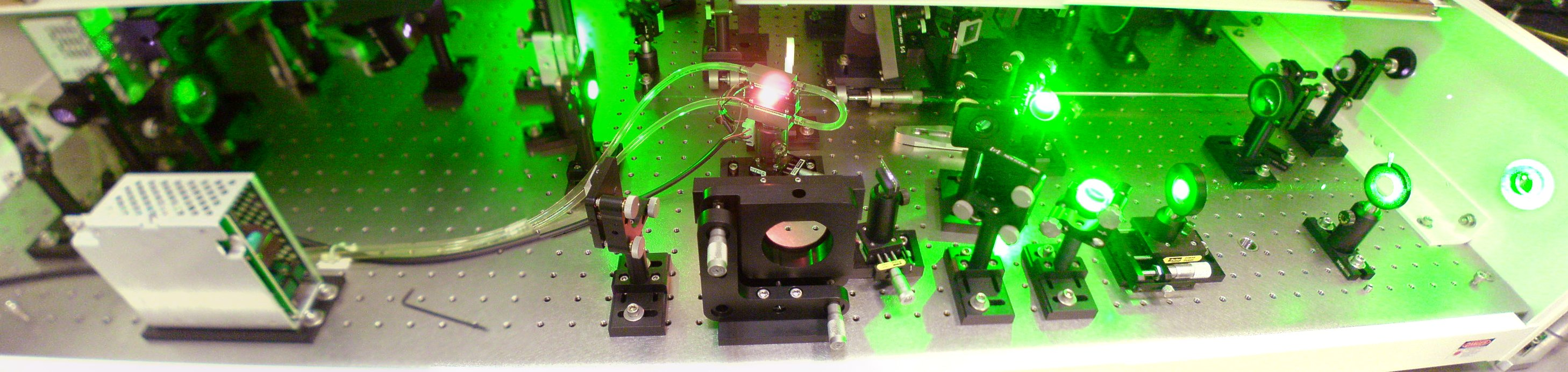
A Ti:Sapphire crystal in the centre of a multipass amplifier Quantronix Odin is pumped by 5W green beam (faintly visible coming from right), amplifies femtosecond pulses that pass it several times under different angles (invisible on the photo) and loses part of energy as red fluorescence light.

The pulses from chirped-pulse amplifiers are often converted to other wavelengths by means of various nonlinear optical processes.

At 5 mJ in 100 femtoseconds, the peak power of such a laser is 50 gigawatts. When focused by a lens, these laser pulses will ionise any material placed in the focus, including air molecules, and lead to short filament propagation and strong nonlinear optics effects that generate a wide spectrum of wavelengths.

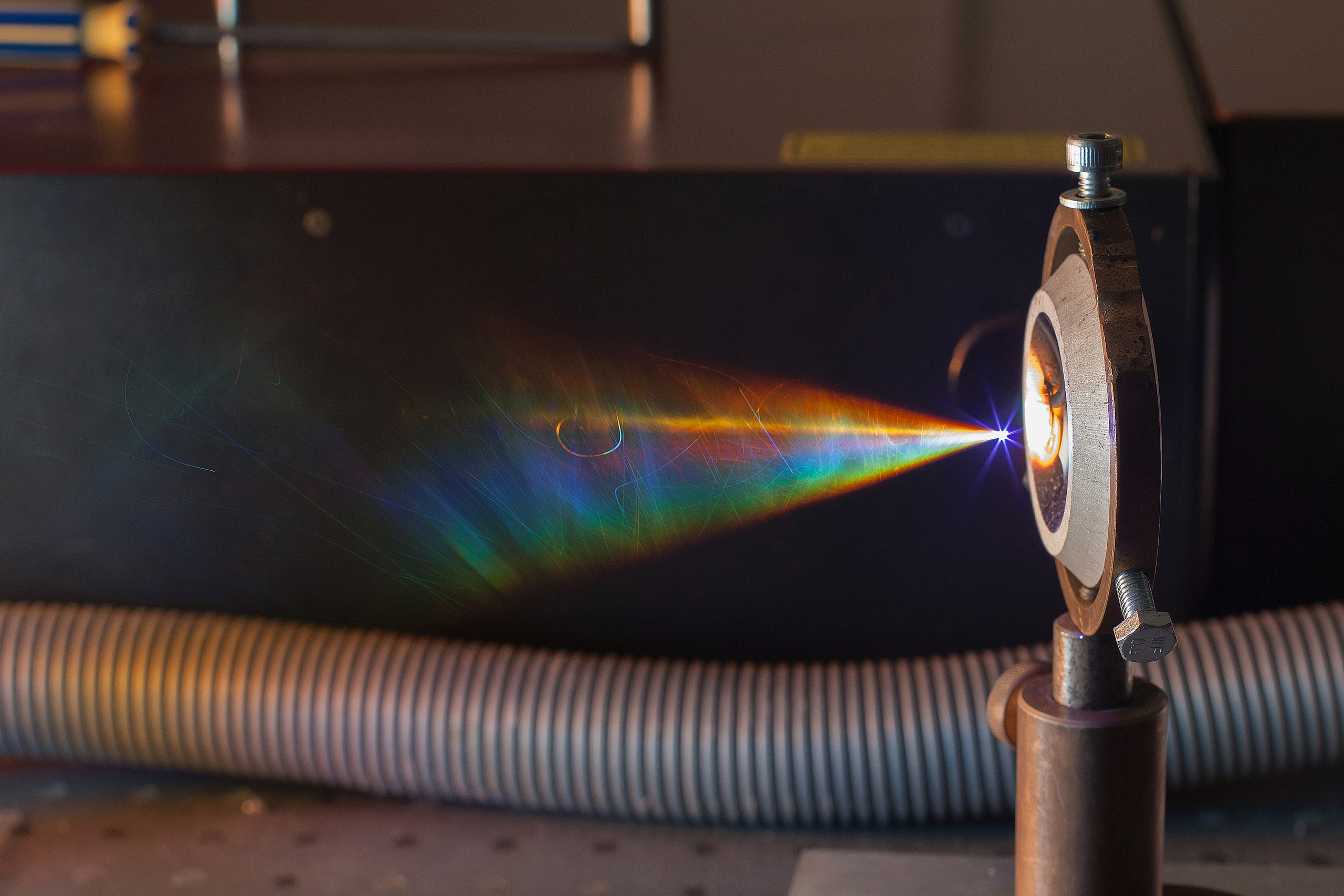
Femtosecond pulses generate multiple angle-resolved colour patterns when focused; note their fan-out angle is even higher than that of the focused laser beam

=== Tunable continuous wave lasers ===
Titanium-sapphire is especially suitable for pulsed lasers since an ultrashort pulse inherently contains a wide spectrum of frequency components. This is due to the inverse relationship between the frequency bandwidth of a pulse and its time duration, due to their being conjugate variables. However, with an appropriate design, titanium-sapphire can also be used in continuous wave lasers with extremely narrow linewidths tunable over a wide range.

== History and applications ==
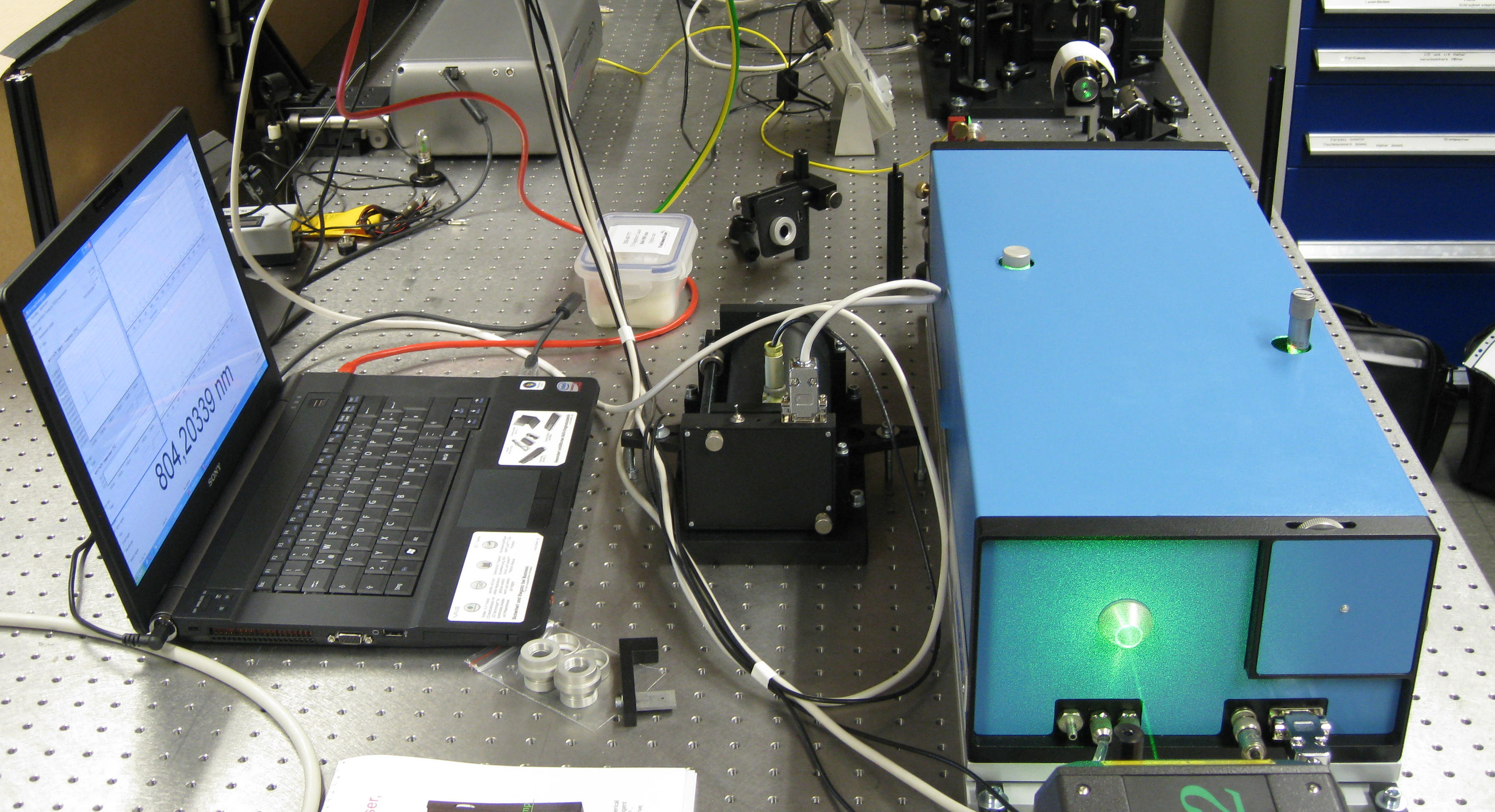
CW single-frequency ring Ti:Sapphire laser in operation at Novosibirsk State University

The Ti:sapphire laser was invented by Peter Moulton in June 1982 at MIT Lincoln Laboratory in its continuous wave version. Subsequently, these lasers were shown to generate ultrashort pulses through Kerr-lens modelocking. Strickland and Mourou, in addition to others, working at the University of Rochester, showed chirped pulse amplification of this laser within a few years, for which these two shared in the 2018 Nobel Prize in physics (along with Arthur Ashkin for optical tweezers). The cumulative product sales of the Ti:sapphire laser has amounted to more than $600 million, making it a big commercial success that has sustained the solid state laser industry for more than three decades.

The ultrashort pulses generated by Ti:sapphire lasers in the time domain corresponds to mode-locked optical frequency combs in the spectral domain. Both the temporal and spectral properties of these lasers make them highly desirable for frequency metrology, spectroscopy, or for pumping nonlinear optical processes. One half of the Nobel prize for physics in 2005 was awarded to the development of the optical frequency comb technique, which heavily relied on the Ti:sapphire laser and its self-modelocking properties. The continuous wave versions of these lasers can be designed to have nearly quantum limited performance, resulting in a low noise and a narrow linewidth, making them attractive for quantum optics experiments. The reduced amplified spontaneous emission noise in the radiation of Ti:sapphire lasers lends great strength in their application as optical lattices for the operation of state-of-the-art atomic clocks. Apart from fundamental science applications in the laboratory, this laser has found biological applications such as deep-tissue multiphoton imaging and industrial applications cold micromachining. When operated in the chirped pulse amplification mode, they can be used to generate extremely high peak powers in the terawatt range, which finds use in nuclear fusion research.
