= Plasma mirror =

Optical mechanism

A plasma mirror is an optical mechanism which can be used to specularly reflect high intensity ultrafast laser beams where nonlinear optical effects prevent the usage of conventional mirrors and to improve laser temporal contrast. If a sufficient intensity is reached, a laser beam incident on a substrate (such as fused silica) will cause the substrate to ionize and the resulting plasma will reflect the incoming beam with the qualities of an ordinary mirror. A single plasma mirror can be used only one time, as during the interaction the beam ionizes the substrate and destroys it.

To achieve a specular reflection, the plasma surface has to stay flat during the interaction with the beam. As high intensity ultrafast lasers reach intensities far greater than those required for plasma formation—and in order to prevent plasma formation and expansion during prepulses preceding the main pulse—the laser temporal contrast (ratio of intensities of prepulses to main pulse) has to be maintained at a low value, such that prepulse intensity is below the ionization threshold.

As high intensity light ionizes the substrate and is reflected but low intensity prepulses, generated by amplified spontaneous emission and generally unwanted, are transmitted, the plasma mirror can be used to enhance the intensity contrast of beams, in a process termed self-induced plasma shuttering. This effect is useful, as many laser-solid experiments are impeded by the presence of intense prepulses. In some setups, to improve contrast two plasma mirrors are used.

Plasma mirrors exhibit high harmonic generation and have been used to produce attosecond extreme ultra-violet pulses. Further applications include electron acceleration and generation of light orbital angular momentum using a spatial phase plate design.
