= Group-velocity dispersion =

Dependence of group velocity on frequency

In optics, group-velocity dispersion (GVD) is a characteristic of a dispersive medium, used most often to determine how the medium affects the duration of an optical pulse traveling through it. Formally, GVD is defined as the derivative of the inverse of group velocity of light in a material with respect to angular frequency,

$$\text{GVD}(\omega_0) \equiv \frac{\partial}{\partial \omega} \left( \frac{1}{v_g(\omega)} \right)_{\omega=\omega_0},$$

where $\omega$ and $\omega_0$ are angular frequencies, and the group velocity $v_g(\omega)$ is defined as $v_g(\omega) \equiv \partial \omega / \partial k$. The units of group-velocity dispersion are [time]^{2}/[distance], often expressed in fs^{2}/mm.

Equivalently, group-velocity dispersion can be defined in terms of the medium-dependent wave vector $k(\omega)$ according to

$$\text{GVD}(\omega_0) \equiv \left( \frac{\partial^2 k}{\partial \omega^2}\right)_{\omega=\omega_0},$$

or in terms of the refractive index $n(\omega)$ according to

$$\text{GVD}(\omega_0) \equiv \frac{2}{c} \left(\frac{\partial n}{\partial \omega}\right)_{\omega=\omega_0} +
\frac{\omega_0}{c}\left( \frac{\partial^2 n}{\partial \omega^2}\right)_{\omega=\omega_0}.$$

== Applications ==
Group-velocity dispersion is most commonly used to estimate the amount of chirp that will be imposed on a pulse of light after passing through a material of interest:

$$\text{chirp} = (\text{material thickness}) \times \text{GVD}(\omega_0) \times (\text{bandwidth}).$$

=== Derivation ===
A simple illustration of how GVD can be used to determine pulse chirp can be seen by looking at the effect of a transform-limited pulse of duration $\sigma$ passing through a planar medium of thickness d. Before passing through the medium, the phase offsets of all frequencies are aligned in time, and the pulse can be described as a function of time,

$$E(t) = Ae^{-\frac{t^2}{4 \sigma^2}} e^{-i \omega_0 t},$$

or equivalently, as a function of frequency,

$$E(\omega) = Be^{-\frac{(w - w_0)^2}{4 (1/2\sigma)^2}}$$

(the parameters A and B are normalization constants). Passing through the medium results in a frequency-dependent phase accumulation $\Delta \phi(\omega) = k(\omega) d$, such that the post-medium pulse can be described by

$$E(\omega) = Be^{-\frac{(w - w_0)^2}{4 (1/2\sigma)^2}} e^{i k(\omega) d}.$$

In general, the refractive index $n(\omega)$, and therefore the wave vector $k(\omega) = n(\omega)\omega/c$, can be an arbitrary function of $\omega$, making it difficult to analytically perform the inverse Fourier transform back into the time domain. However, if the bandwidth of the pulse is narrow relative to the curvature of $n$, then good approximations of the impact of the refractive index can be obtained by replacing $k(\omega)$ with its Taylor expansion centered about $\omega_0$:

$$\frac{n(\omega)\omega}{c} = \underbrace{\frac{n(\omega_0)\omega_0}{c}}_{k(\omega_0)} +
\underbrace{\left[ \frac{n(\omega_0) + n'(\omega_0)\omega_0}{c}\right]}_{k'(\omega_0)}(\omega - \omega_0) +
\frac{1}{2} \underbrace{\left[ \frac{2 n'(\omega_0) + n''(\omega_0)\omega_0}{c} \right]}_{\text{GVD}} (\omega - \omega_0)^2 +
\dots$$

Truncating this expression and inserting it into the post-medium frequency-domain expression results in a post-medium time-domain expression

$$E_\text{post}(t) = A_\text{post} \exp\left[-\frac{\left(t - k'(\omega_0) d\right)^2}{4 \left(\sigma^2 - i\, \text{GVD}\, d/2\right)}\right] e^{i[k(\omega_0) d - \omega_0 t]}.$$

On balance, the pulse is lengthened to an intensity standard deviation value of

$$\sigma_\text{post} = \sqrt{ \sigma^2 + \left[ d\, \textrm{GVD}(\omega_0) \frac{1}{2\sigma}\right]^2 },$$

thus validating the initial expression. Note that a transform-limited pulse has $\sigma_\omega \sigma_t = 1/2$, which makes it appropriate to identify 1/(2σ_{t}) as the bandwidth.

=== Alternate derivation ===
An alternate derivation of the relationship between pulse chirp and GVD, which more immediately illustrates the reason why GVD can be defined by the derivative of inverse group velocity, can be outlined as follows. Consider two transform-limited pulses of carrier frequencies $\omega_1$ and $\omega_2$, which are initially overlapping in time. After passing through the medium, these two pulses will exhibit a time delay between their respective pulse-envelope centers, given by

$$\Delta T = d \left( \frac{1}{v_g(\omega_2)} - \frac{1}{v_g(\omega_1)} \right).$$

The expression can be approximated as a Taylor expansion, giving

$$\Delta T = d \left(
\frac{1}{v_g(\omega_1)} +
\frac{\partial}{\partial \omega}\left( \frac{1}{v_g(\omega')}\right)_{\omega' = \omega_1} (\omega_2 - \omega_1) -
\frac{1}{v_g(\omega_1)}
\right),$$

or

$$\Delta T = d \times \textrm{GVD}(\omega_1) \times (\omega_2 - \omega_1).$$

From here it is possible to imagine scaling this expression up two pulses to infinitely many. The frequency difference $\omega_2 - \omega_1$ must be replaced by the bandwidth, and the time delay $\Delta T$ evolves into the induced chirp.

== Group-delay dispersion ==
A closely related yet independent quantity is the group-delay dispersion (GDD), defined such that group-velocity dispersion is the group-delay dispersion per unit length. GDD is commonly used as a parameter in characterizing layered mirrors, where the group-velocity dispersion is not particularly well-defined, yet the chirp induced after bouncing off the mirror can be well-characterized. The units of group-delay dispersion are [time]^{2}, often expressed in fs^{2}.

The group-delay dispersion (GDD) of an optical element is the derivative of the group delay with respect to angular frequency, and also the second derivative of the optical phase:

$$D_2(\omega) = -\frac{\partial T_g}{d \omega} = \frac{d^2 \phi}{d\omega^2}.$$

It is a measure of the chromatic dispersion of the element. GDD is related to the total dispersion parameter $D_\text{tot}$ as

$$D_2(\omega) = -\frac{2\pi c}{\lambda^2} D_\text{tot}.$$
