= Bandwidth-limited pulse =

Type of wave pulse

The duration-bandwidth product depends on the shape of the power spectrum of the pulse.

A bandwidth-limited pulse (also known as Fourier-transform-limited pulse, or more commonly, transform-limited pulse) is a pulse of a wave that has the minimum possible duration for a given spectral bandwidth. Bandwidth-limited pulses have a constant phase across all frequencies making up the pulse. Optical pulses of this type can be generated by mode-locked lasers.

Any waveform can be disassembled into its spectral components by Fourier analysis or Fourier transformation. The length of a pulse thereby is determined by its complex spectral components, which include not just their relative intensities, but also the relative positions (spectral phase) of these spectral components. For different pulse shapes, the minimum duration-bandwidth product is different. The duration-bandwidth product is minimal for zero phase-modulation. For example, $\mathrm{sech^2}$ pulses have a minimum duration-bandwidth product of 0.315 while gaussian pulses have a minimum value of 0.441.

A bandwidth-limited pulse can only be kept together if the dispersion of the medium the wave is travelling through is zero; otherwise dispersion management is needed to revert the effects of unwanted spectral phase changes. For example, when an ultrashort pulse passes through a block of glass, the glass medium broadens the pulse due to group velocity dispersion.

Keeping pulses bandwidth-limited is necessary to compress information in time or to achieve high field densities, as with ultrashort pulses in modelocked lasers.
