= Femtosecond =

One quadrillionth of a second

femtosecond
- Unit system: SI
- Unit of: time
- Symbol: fs

Conversions
1 fs in ...	... is equal to ...
- SI units: 10^{−15} s

A femtosecond is a unit of time in the International System of Units (SI) equal to 10^{−15} or 1/(1 000 000 000 000 000) of a second; that is, one quadrillionth, or one millionth of one billionth, of a second.

A femtosecond is to a second, as a second is to approximately 31.69 million years.

For context, a ray of light travels approximately 0.3 μm (micrometers) in 1 femtosecond, a distance comparable to the diameter of a virus. The first to make femtosecond measurements was the Egyptian Nobel Laureate Ahmed Zewail, for which he was awarded the Nobel Prize in Chemistry in 1999. Professor Zewail used lasers to measure the movement of particles at the femtosecond scale, thereby allowing chemical reactions to be observed for the first time.

The word femtosecond is formed by the SI prefix femto and the SI unit second. Its symbol is fs.

A femtosecond is equal to 1000 attoseconds, or 1/1000 picosecond. Because the next higher SI unit is 1000 times larger, times of 10^{−14} and 10^{−13} seconds are typically expressed as tens or hundreds of femtoseconds.

- Typical time steps for molecular dynamics simulations are on the order of 1 fs.
- The periods of the waves of visible light have a duration of about 2 femtoseconds. ${\lambda\over{c}} = {600 \times 10^{-9}~{\rm m} \over 3 \times 10^8~{\rm m}~{\rm s}^{-1}} = 2.0 \times 10^{-15}~{\rm s}$ The precise duration depends on the energy of the photons, which determines their color. (See wave–particle duality.) This time can be calculated by dividing the wavelength of the light by the speed of light (approximately 3×10^{8} m/s) to determine the time required for light to travel that distance.

The colors of the visible light spectrum
Color	Wavelength interval	Cycle time interval
Red	~ 700–635 nm	~ 2.3–2.1 fs
Orange	~ 635–590 nm	~ 2.1-2.0 fs
Yellow	~ 590–560 nm	~ 2.0–1.9 fs
Green	~ 560–520 nm	~ 1.9–1.7 fs
Cyan	~ 520–490 nm	~ 1.7–1.6 fs
Blue	~ 490–450 nm	~ 1.6–1.5 fs
Violet	~ 450–400 nm	~ 1.5–1.3 fs

== Examples ==
- 46 fs – the swiftest chemical reaction known (radiolysis of water leads to the formation of a H_{2}O^{+} ion, which rapidly reacts to become hydronium (H_{3}O^{+}) and a short lived hydroxyl radical (•OH))
- 200 fs – the average chemical reaction, such as the reaction of pigments in an eye to light
- 300 fs – the duration of a vibration of the atoms in an iodine molecule

== See also ==
- Femtochemistry
- Femtosecond pulse shaping
- Ultrafast laser spectroscopy
- Mode-locking
- Microsecond
- Millisecond
- Nanosecond
- Orders of magnitude (time)
