= Index of physics articles (G) =

The index of physics articles is split into multiple pages due to its size.

To navigate by individual letter use the table of contents below.

== G ==
- G-factor (physics)
- G-force
- G-parity
- G. B. Pegram
- G. C. Danielson
- G. M. B. Dobson
- G. Michael Morris
- G. Michael Purdy
- G. N. Glasoe
- G. N. Ramachandran
- G. V. Skrotskii
- G. W. Pierce
- GALLEX
- GEANT (program)
- GEKKO XII
- GENERIC formalism
- GEOBASE (database)
- GEO 600
- GHP formalism
- GHZ experiment
- GIM mechanism
- GLEEP
- GLORIA sidescan sonar
- GRAPES-3
- GRENOUILLE
- GROMACS
- GROMOS
- GRS 1915+105
- GRTensorII
- GSI Helmholtz Centre for Heavy Ion Research
- GSI anomaly
- GSO projection
- GW approximation
- GYRO
- Gabriel Gabrielsen Holtsmark
- Gabriel Lippmann
- Gabriele Rabel
- Gabriele Veneziano
- Gabrio Piola
- Gadolinium yttrium garnet
- Gaetano Crocco
- Gaetano Vignola
- Gain-switching
- Gaja Alaga
- Gal (unit)
- Galactic archaeology
- Galactic cosmic ray
- Galaxy cloud
- Galaxy filament
- Galaxy formation and evolution
- Galaxy merger
- Galaxy rotation curve
- Galilean cannon
- Galilean invariance
- Galilean transformation
- Galilei number
- Galileo's Leaning Tower of Pisa experiment
- Galileo Ferraris
- Galileo Galilei
- Galileo thermometer
- Gallium arsenide phosphide
- Gallium indium arsenide antimonide phosphide
- Galvanoluminescence
- Galvanometer
- Gamma-ray astronomy
- Gamma-ray burst
- Gamma-ray burst emission mechanisms
- Gamma-ray burst progenitors
- Gamma camera
- Gamma counter
- Gamma matrices
- Gamma ray
- Gamma spectroscopy
- Gamow-Teller Transition
- Gamow factor
- Ganapathy Baskaran
- Gans theory
- Gareth Roberts (physicist)
- Gargamelle
- Garrett Jernigan
- Garshelis effect
- Gary Bold
- Gary C. Bjorklund
- Gary Gibbons
- Gary L. Bennett
- Gary S. Grest
- Gary Westfall
- Gas
- Gas-discharge lamp
- Gas-filled tube
- Gas-phase ion chemistry
- Gas Electron Multiplier
- Gas centrifuge
- Gas compressor
- Gas constant
- Gas discharge
- Gas dynamic laser
- Gas dynamics
- Gas focusing
- Gas immersion laser doping
- Gas in a box
- Gas in a harmonic trap
- Gas laser
- Gas laws
- Gas thermometer
- Gaseous diffusion
- Gaseous ionization detectors
- Gaspar Schott
- Gaspard-Gustave Coriolis
- Gasparo Berti
- Gaston Planté
- Gauge anomaly
- Gauge boson
- Gauge fixing
- Gauge gravitation theory
- Gauge symmetry
- Gauge symmetry (mathematics)
- Gauge theory
- Gauged supergravity
- Gaugino
- Gaugino condensation
- Gaunt factor
- Gauss' law
- Gauss' law for magnetism
- Gauss's law
- Gauss's law for gravity
- Gauss's law for magnetism
- Gauss's principle of least constraint
- Gauss lens
- Gauss optics
- Gaussian beam
- Gaussian broadening
- Gaussian fixed point
- Gaussian gravitational constant
- Gaussian noise
- Gaussian orbital
- Gaussian polar coordinates
- Gaussian q-distribution
- Gaussian quantum Monte Carlo
- Gaussian surface
- Gaussian units
- Gauss–Codazzi equations (relativity)
- Gay-Lussac's law
- Gaylord Harnwell
- Geant4
- Geertruida de Haas-Lorentz
- Geiger counter
- Geiger tube telescope
- Geiger–Marsden experiment
- Geiger–Müller tube
- Geiger–Nuttall law
- Geissler tube
- Gel
- Gell-Mann matrices
- Gell-Mann–Nishijima formula
- Gell-Mann–Okubo mass formula
- Gene Amdahl
- General Relativity (book)
- General Relativity and Gravitation
- General covariance
- General relativity
- General relativity resources
- Generalized Environmental Modeling System for Surfacewaters
- Generalized Helmholtz theorem
- Generalized Lagrangian mean
- Generalized Maxwell model
- Generalized Newtonian fluid
- Generalized coordinates
- Generalized valence bond
- Generating function (physics)
- Generation (particle physics)
- Generation–recombination noise
- Generator (mathematics)
- Geneva drive
- Gennadi Sardanashvily
- Gennadi Zakharov
- Gennady Mesyats
- Geocentric model
- Geocentric orbit
- Geodesic
- Geodesic deviation equation
- Geodesics as Hamiltonian flows
- Geodesics in general relativity
- Geodetic effect
- Geoff Wilson (professor)
- Geoffrey Chew
- Geoffrey Ingram Taylor
- Geoffrey Thomas
- Geoffrey West
- Geoid
- Geomagnetic jerk
- Geomagnetic latitude
- Geomagnetic pole
- Geomagnetic storm
- Geomechanics
- Geomelting
- Geometric algebra
- Geometric phase
- Geometric quantization
- Geometrical frustration
- Geometrically frustrated magnet
- Geometrized unit system
- Geometrodynamics
- Geon (physics)
- Geonium atom
- Geophysical Journal International
- Geophysical Journal of the Royal Astronomical Society
- Geophysical MASINT
- Geophysical fluid dynamics
- Geophysical survey (archaeology)
- Geophysics
- Geopotential
- Geopotential function
- Geopotential model
- Georg Adolf Erman
- Georg Christoph Lichtenberg
- Georg Hartmann
- Georg Hermann Quincke
- Georg Joos
- Georg Ohm
- Georg Stetter
- Georg Wilhelm Richmann
- Georg Zundel
- Georg von Arco
- Georg von Békésy
- George Adams (scientist, died 1772)
- George Adams (scientist, died 1795)
- George Adolphus Schott
- George Bacon (physicist)
- George Barker Jeffery
- George Bass (optician)
- George Batchelor
- George R. Blumenthal
- George Chapline, Jr.
- George Cowan
- George David Birkhoff
- George Dollond
- George E. Smith
- George Edward Alcorn, Jr.
- George Edward Backus
- George Eleftheriades
- George F. Carrier
- George FitzGerald
- George Francis Rayner Ellis
- George Gamow
- George Gollin
- George Graham (clockmaker)
- George Green (mathematician)
- George H. Miller (physicist)
- George Handley Knibbs
- George Hart (physicist)
- George Hockham
- George Irving Bell
- George Isaak
- George Johnstone Stoney
- George K. Burgess
- George Kalmus
- George Karreman
- George Kistiakowsky
- George Laurence
- George M. Zaslavsky
- George N. Hatsopoulos
- George Nelson (astronaut)
- George Paget Thomson
- George Pake
- George Placzek
- George R. Harrison
- George Randolph Kalbfleisch
- George Robert Carruthers
- George Rochester
- George Smoot
- George Sterman
- George Sudarshan
- George Turner (British politician)
- George Uhlenbeck
- George V. Eleftheriades
- George Volkoff
- George W. Clark
- George W. Lewis
- George Weston (physicist)
- George Wetherill
- George Willis Ritchey
- George Yuri Rainich
- George Zweig
- Georges-Louis Le Sage
- Georges Abrial
- Georges Charpak
- Georges Friedel
- Georges Lemaître
- Georges Sagnac
- Georgi Dvali
- Georgi Manev
- Georgi Nadjakov
- Georgi Nadzhakoff
- Georgiy Zatsepin
- Georgi–Glashow model
- Georgi–Jarlskog mass relation
- Georgy Flyorov
- Georgy Golitsyn
- Geosphere
- Geostationary orbit
- Geostationary ring
- Geostationary transfer orbit
- Geostrophic wind
- Geothermal energy
- Geothermal heat pump
- Geraint F. Lewis
- Gerald B. Whitham
- Gerald Bull
- Gerald E. Brown
- Gerald Feinberg
- Gerald Gabrielse
- Gerald Guralnik
- Gerald Holton
- Gerald James Whitrow
- Gerald Neugebauer
- Gerald Schroeder
- Gerard 't Hooft
- Gerard K. O'Neill
- Gerardus J. Sizoo
- Gerd Binnig
- Gerhard Borrmann
- Gerhard Heinrich Dieke
- Gerhard Herzberg
- Gerhard Hoffmann
- Gerhard Müller (geophysicist)
- Gerhard Schwehm
- German Geophysical Society
- Gernot Zippe
- Geroch energy
- Geroch group
- Gerotor
- Gerrit Jan van Ingen Schenau
- Gersh Budker
- Gerson Goldhaber
- Gerstein Science Information Centre
- Gerstenhaber algebra
- Gertrude Neumark
- Gertrude Rogallo
- Gertrude Scharff Goldhaber
- Ghirardi–Rimini–Weber theory
- Ghost condensate
- Ghost imaging
- Ghulam Murtaza (physicist)
- Giambattista Benedetti
- Gian-Carlo Wick
- Gian Domenico Romagnosi
- Giant magnetoresistance
- Giant resonance
- Gibbons–Hawking effect
- Gibbons–Hawking–York boundary term
- Gibbs' phase rule
- Gibbs algorithm
- Gibbs entropy
- Gibbs free energy
- Gibbs measure
- Gibbs paradox
- Gibbs state
- Gibbs–Donnan effect
- Gibbs–Helmholtz equation
- Gibbs–Thomson equation
- Gilbert Jerome Perlow
- Gilbert N. Lewis
- Gilbert Ronald Bainbridge
- Gilbert Stead
- Gilbert U-238 Atomic Energy Laboratory
- Gilles Cloutier
- Gimbal lock
- Gino Girolamo Fanno
- Ginsberg's theorem
- Ginzburg–Landau theory
- Giorgio Parisi
- Giovanni Aldini
- Giovanni Alfonso Borelli
- Giovanni Amelino-Camelia
- Giovanni Antonio Amedeo Plana
- Giovanni Battista Beccaria
- Giovanni Battista Guglielmini
- Giovanni Battista Venturi
- Giovanni Ciccotti
- Giovanni Gallavotti
- Giovanni Giorgi
- Giovanni Jona-Lasinio
- Giovanni Poleni
- Giovanni Rossi Lomanitz
- Gires–Tournois etalon
- Girish Agarwal
- Gisela Anton
- Giuliano Preparata
- Giulio Racah
- Giuseppe Arcidiacono
- Giuseppe Cocconi
- Giuseppe Domenico Botto
- Giuseppe Occhialini
- Giuseppe Toaldo
- Giuseppe Zamboni
- Giuseppe di Giugno
- Gladstone–Dale relation
- Gladys Anslow
- Glan–Foucault prism
- Glan–Taylor prism
- Glan–Thompson prism
- Glass transition
- Glass transition temperature
- Glass with embedded metal and sulfides
- Glasser effect
- Glauber–Sudarshan P representation
- Gleason's theorem
- Gleb Wataghin
- Glenn T. Seaborg
- Glidant
- Glide plane
- Glider (sailplane)
- Gliding
- Glitch (astronomy)
- Global Convection Currents
- Global Design Effort
- Global Lorentz covariance
- Global anomaly
- Global spacetime structure
- Global symmetry
- Globally hyperbolic manifold
- Globe effect
- Glossary of classical physics
- Glossary of elementary quantum mechanics
- Glossary of physics
- Glossary of string theory
- Glossary of tensor theory
- Glow discharge
- GlueX
- Glueball
- Gluino
- Gluon
- Gluon condensate
- God and the New Physics
- Goddard–Thorn theorem
- Godfrey Gumbs
- Godfrey Louis
- Godunov's scheme
- Godunov's theorem
- Goetz Oertel
- Goff–Gratch equation
- Gold universe
- Goldberger–Wise mechanism
- Goldberg–Sachs theorem
- Golden Goose Award
- Golden age of cosmology
- Golden age of general relativity
- Golden age of physics
- Goldsmiths' Professor of Materials Science
- Goldstino
- Goldstone boson
- Goniometer
- Good quantum number
- Goodman relation
- Goodness factor
- Goos–Hänchen effect
- Gopinath Kartha
- Gordon F. Newell
- Gordon Ferrie Hull
- Gordon Gould
- Gordon L. Kane
- Gordon Research Conferences
- Gordon Shrum
- Gordon Sutherland
- Gotfred Kvifte
- Gottfried Münzenberg
- Gottfried Osann
- Gottfried Wilhelm Leibniz
- Gotthilf Hagen
- Gough–Joule effect
- Gouy balance
- Gowdy solution
- Gowin Knight
- Goéry Delacôte
- Graded-index fiber
- Gradient
- Gradient enhanced NMR spectroscopy
- Gradient theorem
- Gradiometer
- Graetz number
- Graham's law
- Grain boundary diffusion coefficient
- Grand Accélérateur National d'Ions Lourds
- Grand Unified Theory
- Grand canonical ensemble
- Grand potential
- Grand unification energy
- Grand unification epoch
- Grandfather paradox
- Grant O. Gale
- Granular convection
- Granular material
- Granularity
- Granule (solar physics)
- Graphene
- Graphene nanoribbons
- Grashof condition
- Grashof number
- Grassmann integral
- Grassmann number
- Gravastar
- Gravimeter
- Gravimetry
- Graviphoton
- Graviscalar
- Gravitation
- Gravitation (book)
- Gravitational-wave astronomy
- Gravitational-wave detector
- Gravitational Wave International Committee
- Gravitational acceleration
- Gravitational anomaly
- Gravitational binding energy
- Gravitational collapse
- Gravitational constant
- Gravitational convection
- Gravitational energy
- Gravitational field
- Gravitational instanton
- Gravitational interaction of antimatter
- Gravitational lens
- Gravitational lensing formalism
- Gravitational microlensing
- Gravitational mirage
- Gravitational plane wave
- Gravitational potential
- Gravitational redshift
- Gravitational shielding
- Gravitational singularity
- Gravitational time dilation
- Gravitational wave
- Gravitational wave background
- Gravitino
- Gravitoelectromagnetism
- Gravitomagnetic clock effect
- Graviton
- Gravity Probe A
- Gravity Probe B
- Gravity Recovery and Climate Experiment
- Gravity Research Foundation
- Gravity and Extreme Magnetism SMEX
- Gravity anomaly
- Gravity assist
- Gravity current
- Gravity drag
- Gravity gradiometry
- Gravity of Earth
- Gravity train
- Gravity wave
- Gravity well
- Gray (unit)
- Grazing incidence diffraction
- Great Dark Spot
- Greek letters used in mathematics, science, and engineering
- Green's function (many-body theory)
- Green's theorem
- Green flash
- Greenberger–Horne–Zeilinger state
- Greenleaf Whittier Pickard
- Green–Kubo relations
- Green–Schwarz mechanism
- Greg Moore (physicist)
- Greg Parker (physicist)
- Gregale
- Gregor Wentzel
- Gregori Aminoff Prize
- Gregorian telescope
- Gregory Benford
- Gregory Breit
- Gregory Gabadadze
- Gregory S. Boebinger
- Gregory Stock
- Gregory Wannier
- Gregory Wright (astrophysicist)
- Gregory–Laflamme instability
- Greisen–Zatsepin–Kuzmin limit
- Grenville Turner
- Gretar Tryggvason
- Grey noise
- Gribov ambiguity
- GridPP
- Grid fin
- Grigory Barenblatt
- Grigory Gamburtsev
- Grigory Landsberg
- Grism
- Gromov–Witten invariant
- Gross generation
- Gross–Neveu model
- Gross–Pitaevskii equation
- Grote Reber
- Grotthuss–Draper law
- Ground (electricity)
- Ground effect (aircraft)
- Ground effect (cars)
- Ground pressure
- Ground resonance
- Ground state
- Groundwater energy balance
- Group field theory
- Group velocities
- Group velocity
- Grover's algorithm
- GRSI model
- Grüneisen parameter
- Gu Binglin
- Guenter Brueckner
- Guglielmo Marconi
- Guided-mode resonance
- Guided rotor compressor
- Guiding center
- Guido Beck
- Guido Caldarelli
- Guifré Vidal
- Guillaume Amontons
- Gull wing
- Gullstrand–Painlevé coordinates
- Gun-type fission weapon
- Gunn diode
- Gunnar Källén
- Gunnar Nordström
- Gunnar Randers
- Gunn–Peterson trough
- Guo Kexin
- Gupta–Bleuler formalism
- Gurgen Askaryan
- Gurney flap
- Gustaf Dalén
- Gustaf de Laval
- Gustav Heinrich Tammann
- Gustav Heinrich Wiedemann
- Gustav Herglotz
- Gustav Ising
- Gustav Jaumann
- Gustav Kirchhoff
- Gustav Ludwig Hertz
- Gustav Mie
- Gustav Naan
- Gustav Zeuner
- Gustav de Vries
- Gustave-Adolphe Hirn
- Gustave Trouvé
- Guy Deutscher (physicist)
- Guy von Dardel
- Gwyn Jones (physicist)
- Gyration tensor
- Gyrokinetic ElectroMagnetic
- Gyromagnetic ratio
- Gyroradius
- Gyroscope
- Gyrovector space
- Gyula Farkas (natural scientist)
- György Szigeti
- Gérard Mourou
- Gödel metric
- Görtler vortices
- Göttingen Eighteen
- Günter Nimtz
- Günther Dollinger
- Günther Porod
