= Plasma modeling =

Model in computational physics

Plasma modeling refers to solving equations of motion that describe the state of a plasma. It is generally coupled with Maxwell's equations for electromagnetic fields or Poisson's equation for electrostatic fields. There are several main types of plasma models: single particle, kinetic, fluid, hybrid kinetic/fluid, gyrokinetic and as system of many particles.

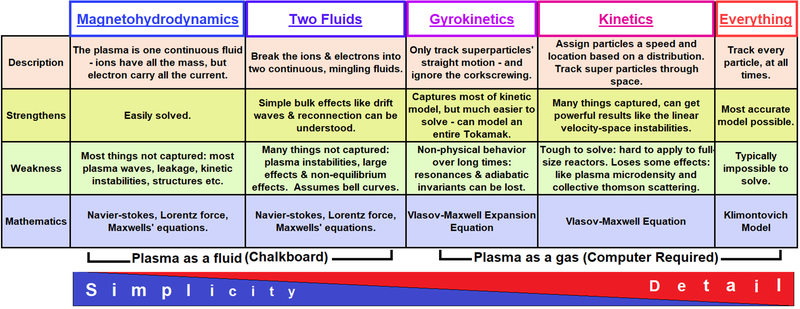
Chart for modeling plasma

== Single particle description ==
The single-particle model describes the plasma as individual electrons and ions moving in imposed (rather than self-consistent) electric and magnetic fields. The motion of each particle is thus described by the Lorentz Force Law. In many cases of practical interest, this motion can be treated as the superposition of a relatively fast circular motion around a point called the guiding center and a relatively slow drift of this point.

== Kinetic description ==
The kinetic model is the most fundamental way to describe a plasma, resultantly producing a distribution function

$$f(\vec{x},\vec{v},t)$$

where the independent variables $\vec{x}$ and $\vec{v}$ are position and velocity, respectively. A kinetic description is achieved by solving the Boltzmann equation or, when the correct description of long-range Coulomb interaction is necessary, by the Vlasov equation which contains self-consistent collective electromagnetic field, or by the Fokker–Planck equation, in which approximations have been used to derive manageable collision terms. The charges and currents produced by the distribution functions self-consistently determine the electromagnetic fields via Maxwell's equations.

== Fluid description ==
To reduce the complexities in the kinetic description, the fluid model describes the plasma based on macroscopic quantities (velocity moments of the distribution such as density, mean velocity, and mean energy). The equations for macroscopic quantities, called fluid equations, are obtained by taking velocity moments of the Boltzmann equation or the Vlasov equation. The fluid equations are not closed without the determination of transport coefficients such as mobility, diffusion coefficient, averaged collision frequencies, and so on. To determine the transport coefficients, the velocity distribution function must be assumed/chosen. But this assumption can lead to a failure of capturing some physics.

== Hybrid kinetic/fluid description ==
Although the kinetic model describes the physics accurately, it is more complex (and in the case of numerical simulations, more computationally intensive) than the fluid model. The hybrid model is a combination of fluid and kinetic models, treating some components of the system as a fluid, and others kinetically. The hybrid model is sometimes applied in space physics, when the simulation domain exceeds thousands of ion gyroradius scales, making it impractical to solve kinetic equations for electrons. In this approach, magnetohydrodynamic fluid equations describe electrons, while the kinetic Vlasov equation describes ions.

== Gyrokinetic description ==
In the gyrokinetic model, which is appropriate to systems with a strong background magnetic field, the kinetic equations are averaged over the fast circular motion of the gyroradius. This model has been used extensively for simulation of tokamak plasma instabilities (for example, the GYRO and Gyrokinetic ElectroMagnetic codes), and more recently in astrophysical applications.

== Quantum mechanical methods ==
Quantum methods are not yet very common in plasma modeling. They can be used to solve unique modeling problems; like situations where other methods do not apply. They involve the application of quantum field theory to plasma. In these cases, the electric and magnetic fields made by particles are modeled like a field; A web of forces. Particles that move, or are removed from the population push and pull on this web of forces, this field. The mathematical treatment for this involves Lagrangian mathematics.

Collisional-radiative modeling is used to calculate quantum state densities and the emission/absorption properties of a plasma. This plasma radiation physics is critical for the diagnosis and simulation of astrophysical and nuclear fusion plasma. It is one of the most general approaches and lies between the extrema of a local thermal equilibrium and a coronal picture. In a local thermal equilibrium the population of excited states is distributed according to a Boltzmann distribution. However, this holds only if densities are high enough for an excited hydrogen atom to undergo many collisions such that the energy is distributed before the radiative process sets in. In a coronal picture the timescale of the radiative process is small compared to the collisions since densities are very small. The use of the term coronal equilibrium is ambiguous and may also refer to the non-transport ionization balance of recombination and ionization. The only thing they have in common is that a coronal equilibrium is not sufficient for tokamak plasma.

== See also ==
- List of plasma physics software
- Particle-in-cell
