= La Grenouille =

La Grenouille, GRENOUILLE or Grenouille may refer to:

- Grenouille, a main character in the novel "Perfume"
- La Grenouille (restaurant), in New York City, US
- René Benoit "La Grenouille", a fictional television character in the NCIS series
- GRENOUILLE, grating-eliminated no-nonsense observation of ultrafast incident laser light e-fields

== See also ==
- Tadpole and the Whale (La Grenouille et la baleine), a film
- La Grenouillere (Monet) or Bain à la Grenouillère, a painting
- Frog (French: grenouille)
