= George Hart =

George Hart may refer to:

- George Hart (cricketer) (1902–1987), English cricketer
- George Hart (Egyptologist) (1945–2021), British Egyptologist
- George Hart (physicist) (fl. late 20th century), American physicist
- George Hart (politician) (1820–1895), New Zealand politician representing the Coleridge electorate
- George Hart (rugby union) (1909–1944), New Zealand rugby union player
- George D. Hart (1846–1932), Massachusetts politician
- George L. Hart (born 1945), American linguist and academic
- George Luzerne Hart Jr. (1905–1984), United States federal judge
- George Z. Hart (1924–2013), American politician from Michigan
- Pop Hart (George Overbury Hart, 1868–1933), American watercolorist
- George Vaughan Hart (academic) (1841–1912), Anglo-Irish academic
- George Vaughan Hart (British Army officer) (1752–1832), British Army officer and politician
- George W. Hart (born 1955), American mathematician, programmer, and sculptor
- George Z. Hart (1924–2013), American politician
