= Pulsed field gradient =

A pulsed field gradient is a short, timed pulse with spatial-dependent field intensity. Any gradient is identified by four characteristics: axis, strength, shape and duration.

Pulsed field gradient (PFG) techniques are key to magnetic resonance imaging, spatially selective spectroscopy and studies of diffusion via diffusion ordered nuclear magnetic resonance spectroscopy (DOSY). PFG techniques are widely used as an alternative to phase cycling in modern NMR spectroscopy.

== Common field gradients in NMR ==
The effect of a uniform magnetic field gradient in the z-direction on spin I, is considered to be a rotation around z-axis by an angle = γ_{I}Gz; where Gz is the gradient magnitude (along the z-direction) and γ_{I} is the gyromagnetic ratio of spin I. It introduces a phase factor to the magnetizations:

Φ (z,τ) = (γ_{I})(Gz)(τ)

The time duration τ is in the order of milliseconds.

== See also ==
- Gradient enhanced NMR spectroscopy
