= Gradient enhanced NMR spectroscopy =

Gradient enhanced NMR is a method for obtaining high resolution nuclear magnetic resonance spectra without the need for phase cycling. Gradient methodology is used extensively for two purposes, either rephasing (selection) or dephasing (elimination) of a particular magnetization transfer pathway. It includes the application of magnetic field gradient pulses to select specific coherences. By using actively shielded gradients, a gradient pulse is applied during the evolution period of the selected coherence to dephase the transverse magnetization and another gradient pulse refocuses the desired coherences remaining during the acquisition period.

== Advantages ==
- Significant reduction in measuring time
- Reduced T1 artifacts
- Elimination of phase cycling and difference methods
- Possibility for three and four-quantum editing
- The ability to detect resonances at the same chemical shift as a strong solvent resonance

== Drawbacks ==
- A need for field-frequency-lock blanking during long runs.

== Examples ==
- Selection of transverse magnetization (I_{x}, S_{x}, I_{y} etc.):

(+)gradient      180°(x)      (+)gradient 

- Suppression of transverse magnetization (I_{x}, S_{x}, I_{y} etc.):

(+)gradient      180°(x)      (-)gradient
