= Garshelis effect =

The Garshelis effect causes springs made of magnetostrictive material to have their magnetization changed due to the compression of the spring. It is a correlation between magnetization and torsional stress. If the magnetization is due to direct current, it is the inverse of the Wiedemann effect.

It is named after Ivan Garshelis, who investigated the effect.
