= Gaetano Vignola =

Italian accelerator physicist

Gaetano Vignola is an Italian accelerator physicist who works on high energy particle physics. He is the builder of the particle collider of INFN in 1987 in Frascati, Italy, as well as the project leader for the DAFNE particle accelerator project. He has trained many students and researchers in the field of particle accelerator technology and contributed in many giant accelerator projects in the world.
