= Geomelting =

GeoMelt is a process by which dangerous, contaminated material (such as radioactive waste and heavy metals) is mixed with clean soil, a blend of industrial minerals, and/or glass frit and melted to create an extremely hard and leach-resistant glass product. Vitrification immobilizes nearly all of the inorganic contaminants (i.e., radionuclides and heavy metals) present in the initial mixture by incorporation into the glass matrix. Organic wastes in the melt are destroyed by pyrolysis, and gaseous contaminants released during the melting process are treated separately.

Developed in 1980 by the U.S. Department of Energy's Pacific Northwest National Laboratory (PNNL), the GeoMelt process is deployed in one of two ways: in-situ (in-place) treatment of buried radioactive and hazardous wastes, and In-Container Vitrification (ICV), which is ex-situ treatment where radioactive and hazardous wastes are vitrified in a refractory-lined steel container.

== Process ==
=== Vitrification ===
Geomelting is based on the principle of vitrification, the process by which a glass is formed. To effectively vitrify any mixture of materials, substances that contribute to glass formation (called glass formers) must be present. These glass formers usually contain silicon and oxygen and are present in most soils.

Much of the efficiency of this process has to do with how much waste material can be mixed with glass formers. Industrial-scale melts have shown that a stable glass compound is formed even when the original melt mixture is up to 33-40% waste material by weight, depending on the type of waste.

=== Melting ===
First, waste is mixed with soil containing glass formers in a large container installed with electrodes (electrical conductors) suitable for heating the mixture. The container used is either underground (subsurface planar vitrification, or SPV) or above ground (in-container vitrification, or ICV). In both cases, the waste/soil mixture is loaded into the container and the heating processes begins when the electrodes are turned on. Due to spatial restrictions, the entire mixture cannot melt at the same time. The materials closest to the electrodes are melted first, and convection currents (movements of substances in a fluid) within the molten mixture continue to add more solid material into the molten material. After about 36-58 hours, all of the mixture is molten and the convection currents create homogeneity (equal distribution of components) within the resultant mixture.

==== Subsurface Planar Vitrification (SPV) ====
In subsurface planar vitrification, all melting operations are performed at the site of contamination. A very tall (around 6 meters deep), narrow cavern is dug into the contaminated soil, which serves as the melting container. Very large electrodes are positioned within the cavern to optimize melting times. The hazardous waste is then mixed with soil inside the cavern and the melt is initiated. After the glass product has been formed, it is either left in the ground or transferred to a disposal facility.

===== Advantages =====
SPV melts do not require much capital investment, because the only construction necessary is the cavern that must be dug and the retrieval of the vitrified mass after the melt. SPV melts cost roughly $355–461 per ton of processed waste. When compared to the disposal cost of $555 per kilogram (or $500,000 per ton) of nuclear waste, SPV is very cost-effective. There is also very little risk of worker injury on the job because the melting process happens underground and away from the workers at the site. Finally, the melt caverns have no size restrictions, so SPV can handle very large volumes of waste at once.

===== Disadvantages =====
SPV does not come without its drawbacks. In order to perform an SPV melt, all materials and personnel must be moved to the melting site, so the costs of transportation for both must be taken into consideration. Once all contaminants have been removed or destroyed at the site, the project must relocate to continue operations. Melts cannot begin immediately after a treatment team arrives because it takes a few hours to dig the caverns and position the electrodes inside.

==== In-Container Vitrification (ICV) ====
In-container vitrification melts are carried out above ground in a container made of heat-resistant metal coated with a protective layer of sand. The sand separates the container walls from the molten mixture and shapes the glass product after it has cooled. Melts are carried out in quick succession; once one melt has cooled, another waste container is loaded with electrodes and the process begins again. The vitrified glass is then sent to a disposal facility.

===== Advantages =====
Because these melts are carried out at a treatment facility, all melts are efficient and centralized to that location. Waste/soil mixtures are systematically loaded and processed in the facility. Since the mixtures are melted above ground, machines do not have to dig up the glass product like in SPV melts. The melt containers are also the containers used to transport the glass, so there are fewer transfers involved in the glass's disposal.

===== Disadvantages =====
ICV melts have their downsides as well. The most immediate concern of ICV melts is the cost. ICV requires a treatment facility, meaning either a new facility must be built or an existing facility must be renovated to accommodate the new process. Both methods require considerable capital investment. Even after the facility is prepared for the process, ICV melts cost about $1,585 per ton of processed waste (3-4 times the cost of an SPV melt). This extra cost is due to the necessary safety precautions in the facility. For example, the melting process occurs at very high (1200 to 2000 °C) temperatures, and some of this heat is dispersed throughout the facility; so adequate cooling and ventilation are needed for areas where workers are present.

=== Off-Gas Treatment ===
While the contaminated mixture is melting, gases (called off-gases) are released, which are hazardous substances themselves. These gases are captured by a steel fume hood and sent through a treatment system that then removes about 99.9999% of the contaminants. Standard treatment procedures span from filtration to wet scrubbing (using liquid to remove gaseous contaminants), though the exact procedures depend on the gases being treated.

== Applications ==
Hazardous materials are often very difficult to remove and treat. The contaminants might be seeped into the soil, contained within a sludge, or present within spent nuclear reactor cores. No matter where a hazard exists, each requires a different method of treatment and disposal using standard waste management processes. With geomelting, however, the treatment (melting) process is essentially the same for each batch, as is the glass produced, regardless of the contaminants in the mixture. Due to this versatility, geomelting is employed in many hazard-control operations.

=== Organics ===
GeoMelt is used to treat a variety of organic wastes including oils, pesticides and herbicides, solvents and persistent organic pollutants including polychlorinated biphenyls (PCBs), dioxins, and furans (GeoMelt is permitted by the U.S. Environmental Protection Agency (EPA) as an approved thermal treatment method for PCBs throughout the U.S. These wastes are carcinogens (cancer-causing substances) and often impair critical bodily functions (e.g. breathing) over time. The melting process destroys organic compounds because no organic materials are able to survive the high temperatures of the melt process.

=== Inorganics ===
Inorganic contaminants like heavy metals (toxic metals including mercury, cadmium, and lead) are released into the environment via industrial leaks and automobile waste. If left unattended, these inorganic hazards can deteriorate ecosystems and cause mental/physical illnesses in humans. Regardless of the mixture of metals, geomelting isolates these heavy metals in a glass matrix and prevents them from entering the environment, eliminating the threat posed to the surroundings.

=== Radioactive materials ===
Since the advent of nuclear power plants, nuclear pollution (the dispersal of radioactive materials) has become a problem for the environment. The amount of radiation in radioactive materials may not be safe for living organisms, so it is important for all nuclear pollution to be removed. Nuclear waste naturally remains hazardous for hundreds of years, but when processed with geomelting, radioactive materials are immobilized.
