= Generalized Environmental Modeling System for Surfacewaters =

- Original authors: Edward M. Buchak, John Edinger, Venkat Kolluru
- Developer: ERM
- Release: 1980; 46 years ago
- License: Freeware / Public domain software
- Website: gemss.com

Generalized Environmental Modeling System for Surfacewaters or GEMSS is a public domain software application published by ERM. It has been used for hydrological studies throughout the world.

== History ==
GEMSS has been used for ultimate heat sink analyses at Comanche Peak Nuclear Power Plant, and Arkansas Nuclear One. In Pennsylvania it has been applied at PPL Corporation's Brunner Island Steam Electric Station on the lower Susquehanna River, Exelon’s Cromby and Limerick Generating Stations on the Schuylkill River, and at several other electric power facilities. River applications for electric power facilities have been made on the Susquehanna (Brunner Island), the Missouri(Labadie Power Station), the Delaware (Mercer and Gilbert Generating Station), the Connecticut (Connecticut Yankee Nuclear Power Plant), and others.

Applications of GEMSS and its individual component modules have been accepted by regulatory agencies in the U.S. and Canada. It is the sole hydrodynamic model listed in the model selection tool database for hydrodynamic and chemical fate models that can perform 1-D, 2-D, and 3-D time-variable modeling for most waterbody types, consider all state variables and include the near- and far-fields. GEMSS can also provide GUI’s, grid generation, and GIS linkage tools and has strong documentation.

== Features ==
GEMSS includes a grid generator and editor, control file generator, 2-D and 3-D post processing viewers, and an animation tool. It uses a database approach to store and access model results. The database approach is also used for field data; as a result, the GEMSS viewers can be used to display model results, field data or both, a capability useful for understanding the behavior of the prototype as well as for calibrating the model. The field data analysis features can be used independently using GEMSS modeling capability.

=== Modeling techniques ===
A GEMSS application requires two types of data: (1) spatial data (primarily the waterbody shoreline and bathymetry, but also locations, elevations, and configurations of man-made structures) and (2) temporal data (time-varying boundary condition data defining tidal elevation, inflow rate and temperature, inflow constituent concentration, outflow rate, and meteorological data. All deterministic models, including GEMSS, require uninterrupted time-varying boundary condition data. There can be no long gaps in the datasets and all required datasets must be available during the span of the proposed simulation period.

For input to the model, the spatial data is encoded primarily in two input files: the control and bathymetry files. These files are geo-referenced. The temporal data is encoded in many files, each file representing a set of time-varying boundary conditions, for example, meteorological data for surface heat exchange and wind shear, or inflow rates for a tributary stream. Each record in the boundary condition files is stamped with a year-month-day-hour-minute address. The data can be subjected to quality assurance procedures by using GEMSS to plot, then to visually inspect individual data points, trends and outliers. The set of input files and the GEMSS executable constitute the model application.
