= Ginsberg's theorem =

Parody of the laws of thermodynamics

Ginsberg's theorem is an epigrammatic paraphrase and parody "theorem" which restates or analogizes the consequences of the four laws of thermodynamics of physics in terms of a person playing a game. It has various formulations, but it can be more or less expressed as:

Ginsberg's theorem:—
1. There is a game, which you are already playing. (consequence of zeroth law of thermodynamics)
2. You cannot win in the game. (consequence of first law of thermodynamics)
3. You cannot break even in the game. (consequence of second law of thermodynamics)
4. You cannot even quit the game. (consequence of third law of thermodynamics)

The theorem is named after the poet Allen Ginsberg, though there does not appear to be any concrete evidence that Ginsberg himself coined the theorem. The phrase is sometimes stated as a general adage without specific reference to the laws of thermodynamics.

== History ==
A comprehensive history and etymology of the epigrammatic phrase can also be found from the etymologist Barry Popik.

The phrase is often attributed to the British scientist C. P. Snow, who apparently was credited by his students for using it to help learn the laws of thermodynamics in the 1950s. However this claim appears to be without a source.

A semblance of the phrase appears to have been first printed in a 1953 issue of the science fiction magazine Astounding Science Fiction, whose editor, John Wood Campbell Jr., referenced acoustic engineer and professor Dwight Wayne Batteau of Harvard University:

"I suggest that there are some laws of ethics that are not human, but Universal. Wayne Batteau and his Speculative Society group at Harvard sent me one little pair of statements that are decidedly revealing in that respect.
“You can't win.” (The Law of Conservation of Energy.)
“You can't even break even.” (Second Law of Thermodynamics.)
When you stop to think about it, that “You can't win,” bears a strong resemblance to the old moral adage “You can't get something for nothing.”"

— John W. Campbell, Jr., Intelligence Test, Astounding SCIENCE FICTION, 1953 November, Vol. LII (52), no. 3 (November), pg. 8

In a 1956 issue of the same magazine, Batteau himself expanded it further in what appears to have been the first complete mention of the epigrammatic phrase in print:

"The Three Laws of Thermodynamics, translated from Mathematics into English, come out:
1. You can't win.
2. You can't even break even.
3. Furthermore, you can't get out of the game!"

— Wayne Batteau, English Translation, Astounding SCIENCE FICTION, 1956 December, Vol. LVIII (58), no. 4 (December), pg. 43

It was later presented in the literary magazine The Kenyon Review in a 1960 short story titled "Entropy" from widely-regarded novelist Thomas Pynchon, who was still then an engineering physics undergraduate at Cornell University:

"Callisto had learned a mnemonic device for remembering the Laws of Thermodynamics: you can't win, things are going to get worse before they get better, who says they're going to get better."

— Thomas Pynchon, Entropy, The Kenyon Review, 1960 April, Vol. XXII (22), no. 2 (Spring), pg. 282

Physicist William R. Corliss also partly wrote about the phrase in a 1964 educational booklet freely distributed by the United States Atomic Energy Commission to disseminate knowledge about atomic energy to the American public:

"The Law of Conservation of Energy and Mass is also called the First Law of Thermodynamics. It is related to the Second Law of Thermodynamics, which also governs energy transformations. The Second Law says, in effect, that some energy will unavoidably be lost in all heat engines. The first two laws of thermodynamics have been paraphrased as (1) You can't win; (2) You can't even break even."

— William R. Corliss, Direct Conversion of Energy, United States Atomic Energy Commission, 1974 January, pg. 8

Science writer Isaac Asimov stated at least the first two laws in a 1970 article, and was being credited with the paraphrased version by the end of the decade.

The phrase then appeared in a non-scientific setting in the opening lines of the popular song "You Can't Win" originally written by songwriter Charlie Smalls for the stage musical The Wiz:

"You can't win, you can't break even
And you can't get out of the game"

— Charlie Smalls, You Can't Win, The Wiz, 1974 October

The song was written by Smalls in 1974 and performed during the 1974 Baltimore run of the musical. The song later reached number 81 on the Billboard Hot 100. Though the song was formally released in 1979 as part of a musical soundtrack album, it was originally written and copyrighted by Smalls in 1974.

Remarkably, Allen Ginsberg appears to have only ever written about the laws of thermodynamics once, in his 1973 poem "Yes and It's Hopeless", though not in any connection to the original epigrammatic phrase:

"All hopeless, the entire solar system running
Thermodynamics' Second Law
down the whole galaxy, all universes brain illusion or solid electric hopeless"

— Allen Ginsberg, Yes and It's Hopeless, 1973 March

Thus Ginsberg was seemingly, at the very least, cognizant of the laws of thermodynamics by the time of 1973. It is claimed that Ginsberg supposedly mentioned the epigrammatic phrase as a fun fact during a poetry session in or around 1974. In 1975, someone — possibly either Ginsberg's gay partner and poet Peter Orlovsky, poetry associate William Burroughs, or Philip Whalen — compiled a collection of quirky laws, including a "Ginsberg's Theorem" based on Ginsberg's prior musings.

In 1975, Ginsberg's theorem formally appeared by name, with no association to thermodynamics, in a listing of parody-like proverb laws by Conrad Schneiker in the counterculture magazine The CoEvolution Quarterly:

"Ginsberg's Theorem
1) You can't win.
2) You can't break even.
3) You can't even quit the game."

— Conrad Schneiker, An Abridged Collection of Interdisplicinary Laws, The CoEvolution Quarterly, 1975 December, No. 8 (Winter)

It may be possible that this appearance originated from a slight misstatement of the lines in the earlier 1974 song by Charlie Smalls.

Writer Arthur Bloch, in his popular 1977 book "Murphy's Law and Other Reasons Why Things Go Wrong!" which popularized Murphy's law, conflated the Ginsberg's theorem with the science of thermodynamics:

"The official party line of technology, of science itself, is despair. If you doubt this, witness the laws of thermodynamics as they are restated in Ginsberg's Theorem."

— Arthur Bloch, Murphy's Law and Other Reasons Why Things Go Wrong!, 1977 October, pg. 8

"GINSBERG'S THEOREM:
1. You can't win.
2. You can't break even.
3. You can't even quit the game."

— Arthur Bloch, Murphy's Law and Other Reasons Why Things Go Wrong!, 1977 October, pg. 18

Notably, the book's acknowledgements mention Conrad Schneiker, who had written about Ginsberg's theorem in The CoEvolution Quarterly just two years prior in 1975. The theorem may have also been relayed to Bloch in conversation with his acquaintance Harris Freeman, who he knew from University of California, Santa Cruz, and who had found a collection of "laws", including Murphy's Law, Ginsberg's Theorem, and many others, somewhere on the ARPANET (a precursor of the Internet) in the mid 1970s while working as a systems administrator for ILLIAC IV (the world's first massively parallel computer) at the NASA Ames Research Center near Mountain View, California. With the publication of Bloch's book, Ginsberg's theorem seemingly thereafter became much more widely known.
