= Guided-mode resonance =

Phenomenon in optics

Guided-mode resonance or waveguide-mode resonance is a phenomenon wherein the guided modes of an optical waveguide can be excited and simultaneously extracted by the introduction of a phase-matching element, such as a diffraction grating or prism. Such guided modes are also called "leaky modes", as they do not remain guided, and have been observed in one and two-dimensional photonic crystal slabs.

== Grating coupler ==
An example of guided-mode resonance is a grating coupler, which is a region on top of or below a waveguide where there is a grating. Off-resonance light incident on the grating behaves almost the same as it would if it was incident in an area where there is no grating. Waveguides are usually made of dielectric and are transparent. For specific combinations of incident angles and light frequency, there is resonance, allowing the grating to couple light into a guided mode of the waveguide.

Typically, the grating coupler has only a few periods, so light can be coupled into the waveguide, but not back out. In such a case, light will be guided in the waveguide until it reaches the waveguide edge, or an additional coupling element, which will couple the light out. The larger the diffraction efficiency of the grating, the larger percent of light that would be coupled in. If the grating is used as a coupling-out element, the larger the diffraction efficiency, the fewer periods would be needed to couple the light out.

== Grating waveguide structures ==
A grating coupler that is extended over the whole surface of the grating results in a combined structure sometimes called a grating waveguide structure. In such a structure, light cannot be guided, as any light coupled in is also coupled out. At resonance, a normally transparent structure becomes reflective. If the grating period is sub-wavelength, then the normally-transparent structure becomes a mirror under resonance conditions. These conditions include the angle, frequency (wavelength), and polarization of the incident light. At resonance, there is also a much higher intensity in the waveguide region. Such intensities are called evanescent as they decay exponentially outside of the waveguide region.

The guided mode resonance can be used to design filters and sensors.
