= GYRO =

Computational plasma physics code

GYRO is a computational plasma physics code developed and maintained at General Atomics. It solves the 5-D coupled gyrokinetic-Maxwell equations using a combination of finite difference, finite element and spectral methods. Given plasma equilibrium data, GYRO can determine the rate of turbulent transport of particles, momentum and energy.
