= George Hart (physicist) =

American physicist

George A. Hart (fl. late 20th century) is a physicist and is best known in regard to his regular appearances on the Coast to Coast AM late-night radio talk show, and to a lesser extent for a discovery leading to an improvement of the rare gas halide excimer laser. Hart specialized in the application of supercomputers to the mathematical modeling of systems exhibiting extremely complex behavior. As a consultant to the Pentagon, he continues to work on the next generation of Strategic Defense Initiative technology.

== Excimer laser ==
The first excimer laser was invented in 1970 by Nikolai Basov, yet Dr. Hart continued to take credit for having invented the excimer laser on several occasions from 2012 to 2013 while appearing on the air on the Coast to Coast AM late-night talk show. Five years after its inception and two years after Northrop Corporation Research and Technology Center's team leader, Dr. Bhaumik announced the successful demonstration of the world's first efficient excimer laser at the Denver, Colorado meeting of the Optical Society of America in May 1973, Hart along with Naval Research Laboratory colleague, Stuart Searles, (also confer Charles Brau, James J. Ewing) invented (and patented) an excimer laser improvement. Hart also had nothing to do with the invention of LASIK, as the first patent was granted by the U.S. Patent Office to Dr. Gholam A. Peyman on June 20, 1989.

== MERLIN Project ==
In 1989, Hart began an ongoing collaboration with futurist Paul Guercio which resulted in the creation of The MERLIN Project (Time-Pattern) research. MERLIN, a Fortran-written software program is claimed to be the first scientifically based forecasting technology that combines equations derived from celestial phenomena with past historical data to produce a graphical time-line, or 'timetrak.' With their progress on the development of the program, Hart and Guercio have been able to predict a number of future events, including the re-election of Barack Obama by July 2012.

"MERLIN was initially developed in the summer of 1989. In the fall of the same year, the collapse of the Honicker government in East Germany and subsequent dissolution of the entire Soviet Union, was MERLIN's first and most prescient call to date."

On Coast To Coast AM, it was admitted that the core working math found in Astrology was at least observed in the process of coming up with the math behind MERLIN. The project's similarities with Astrology has led to criticism that Dr. Hart & Mr. Guercio have 'gone to great measures' to 'disguise and mislead from the fact that they are doing Astrology,' although there are many technical differences between Astrology and MERLIN. MERLIN does not explicitly forecast events, but rather it can be used to find patterns between concerning time-lines to offer a prediction.

"Based on a starting date (in the case of a person - their birth), the timetraks graph out periods of cyclical intervals, showing peak activity, as well as lulls."

Claims of 'misleading language' include that of George Hart & Paul Guercio's other websites, where "they imply a connection between the Pentagon and their astrological work on MERLIN," where George Hart is claimed to be a consultant on an unrelated issue. "On their website, they make the claim that they sent in a white paper. So could anyone. That does NOT mean that the Pentagon values nor pays for their astrological work."

== Awards ==
In 1992, Hart was awarded, along with five colleagues, the RANK Prize "For their discoveries leading to the development of the rare gas halide excimer lasers".
