= GRENOUILLE =

Grating-eliminated no-nonsense observation of ultrafast incident laser light e-fields (GRENOUILLE) is an ultrashort pulse measurement technique based on frequency-resolved optical gating (FROG). The acronym was chosen because of the technique's relationship to FROG; grenouille is French for frog.

== Theory ==
Because most FROG techniques have an autocorrelator, they also have the sensitive alignment issues that come with it. In addition, most FROGs use a thin second-harmonic generation (SHG) crystal and a spectrometer, adding signal strength requirements as well as additional alignment issues. GRENOUILLE is a simple device based on the SHG FROG, replacing the beam splitter, delay line and beam recombination components of the autocorrelator with a prism, and replacing the spectrometer and thin SHG crystal combination with a thick SHG crystal. The effect of these replacements is to eliminate all sensitive alignment parameters while increasing the signal strength. These changes also reduce the complexity and cost of this type of system. However, like the previous systems, GRENOUILLE still determines the full phase and intensity data of a pulse and produces traces identical in form to those from SHG FROG.

A typical GRENOUILLE setup.

A typical GRENOUILLE setup used with a theoretical square input beam can be seen above. The first element, a horizontal cylindrical lens, is used to tightly focus the incoming signal beam into a horizontal stripe at the thick SHG crystal in order to yield a range of crystal incidence angles (more on this below). While being focused, the beam is passed through a Fresnel biprism with an apex angle close to 180°. The Fresnel biprism is essentially two thin prisms joined at their base. The effect of this element is to split the beam into two sources and superimpose the two at the focus point in the SHG crystal, thus mapping delay to the horizontal position. This replaces the function of the autocorrelator in the original FROG designs. However, unlike the autocorrelator, the beams from the Fresnel biprism are automatically aligned in time and space, eliminating a number of sensitive alignment parameters.

The thick SHG crystal in this setup performs two duties. The two identical beams from the biprism cross in the crystal with a delay that varies in the horizontal direction, which is effectively a self-gating process. The second function of the SHG crystal is to act as the spectrometer by converting vertical incidence angle into wavelength. The limited phase-matching bandwidth of the crystal causes the generated wavelength to vary with the incidence angle. Thus, the initial focus must be tight enough to include the entire spectrum of the pulse. After the SHG crystal, cylindrical lenses are used to image the signal onto a camera with wavelength mapped vertically while the delay is mapped horizontally.

Overall, a number of things occur in the crystal: First, the two beams or pulses from the biprism are being crossed at a very large angle which acts as a single-shot autocorrelator, self-gating the pulse to produce a varying delay in the horizontal direction. In the vertical direction, the limited phasematched bandwidth of the crystal phasematches a different small portion of the input pulse bandwidth for each incidence angle, effectively acting as a spectrometer. The result is the wavelength spectrum in the vertical direction for each amount of delay in the horizontal direction.

It is important to consider the ‘thick’ SHG crystal requirements. In a normal second harmonic generation, the goal is to minimize the group-velocity mismatch (GVM) in order to maximize phase-matching bandwidth. This is typically achieved by requiring the fundamental and second harmonic wavevectors to overlap throughout the crystal length, L. However, in a GRENOUILLE the goal is to only phasematch a portion of the pulse bandwidth in order to act as a frequency filter. This leads to the constraint that the product of the GVM and L must be much greater than the pulse length, $\tau_p$. Using the definition of GVM for SHG

$$GVM(\lambda_{0}) \equiv \left ( \frac{1}{\nu_{g}(\lambda_0/2)} -\frac{1}{\nu_{g}(\lambda_0)} \right )$$

where $\nu_{g}(\lambda)$ is the group velocity at wavelength, $\lambda$, the constraint is

$$GVM(\lambda_{0})L \gg \tau_p$$

In addition, if the crystal is too thick, the accumulation of group-velocity dispersion (GVD) will cause excessive pulse spreading. To prevent this, the product of GVD and crystal length L should be much less than the pulse coherence time, $\tau_c$, which is the reciprocal of the bandwidth. Using the definition of GVD

$$GVD(\lambda_{0}) \equiv \left ( \frac{1}{\nu_{g}(\lambda_0-\delta\lambda/2)} -\frac{1}{\nu_{g}(\lambda_0+\delta\lambda/2)} \right )$$

where $\delta\lambda$ is the pulse bandwidth, leads to the form

$$\tau_c \gg GVD(\lambda_{0})L$$

These two constraints can be rearranged and combined to get

$$GVD\frac{\tau_p}{\tau_c}\ll \frac{\tau_p}{L} \ll GVM$$

The time-bandwidth product (TBP) of a pulse is defined as the ratio of pulse length to pulse coherence time, $\tau_p/\tau_c$. This means that a crystal length L will satisfy the simultaneous condition above if

$$\frac{GVM}{GVD}\gg TBP$$

which is considered the fundamental relationship of the system. From this, it can be seen that material properties and crystal dimensions will affect GRENOUILLE's temporal and spectral resolution. In addition, the depth of focus into the crystal can produce an effectively shorter crystal, allowing some tuning of the resolution for pulses of different bandwidths. To understand the performance of a given crystal, a factor, A, is introduced to the GVD and GVM conditions, which can be rearranged to get

$$\frac{GVD(\lambda_0)}{A}L \le \tau_p \le A GVM(\lambda_0)L$$

In the above equation, the TBP has been assumed to be approximately equal to 1, indicating a near-transform limited pulse. If A is much greater than 1 then the condition is well satisfied. The case where A equals 1 is considered the cutoff for satisfying the condition and is the edge of where the crystal can resolve a pulse. Typically, A is chosen as a conservative number such as 3. These equations can be used to determine the working limits for a given setup as a function of wavelength.

== See also ==
- Frequency-resolved optical gating
