= Guiding center =

Concept in plasma physics

Charged particle drifts in a homogeneous magnetic field. (A) No disturbing force (B) With an electric field, E (C) With an independent force, F (e.g. gravity) (D) In an inhomogeneous magnetic field, grad H

In physics, the motion of an electrically charged particle such as an electron or ion in a plasma in a magnetic field can be treated as the superposition of a relatively fast circular motion around a point called the guiding center and a relatively slow drift of this point. The drift speeds may differ for various species depending on their charge states, masses, or temperatures, possibly resulting in electric currents or chemical separation.

== Gyration ==
If the magnetic field is uniform and all other forces are absent, then the Lorentz force will cause a particle to undergo a constant acceleration perpendicular to both the particle velocity and the magnetic field. This does not affect particle motion parallel to the magnetic field, but results in circular motion at constant speed in the plane perpendicular to the magnetic field. This circular motion is known as the gyromotion or cyclotron motion. For a particle with mass $m$ and charge $q$ moving in a magnetic field with strength $B$, it has a frequency, called the gyrofrequency or cyclotron frequency, of
$$\omega_{\rm c} = \frac{|q|B}{m} .$$

For a speed perpendicular to the magnetic field of $v_{\perp}$, the radius of the orbit, called the gyroradius or Larmor radius, is
$$\rho_{\rm L} =\frac{ v_{\perp}}{ \omega_{\rm c}} .$$

== Parallel motion ==
Since the magnetic Lorentz force is always perpendicular to the magnetic field, it has no influence (to lowest order) on the parallel motion. In a uniform field with no additional forces, a charged particle will gyrate around the magnetic field according to the perpendicular component of its velocity and drift parallel to the field according to its initial parallel velocity, resulting in a helical orbit. If there is a force with a parallel component, the particle and its guiding center will be correspondingly accelerated.

If the field has a parallel gradient, a particle with a finite Larmor radius will also experience a force in the direction away from the larger magnetic field. This effect is known as the magnetic mirror. While it is closely related to guiding center drifts in its physics and mathematics, it is nevertheless considered to be distinct from them.

== General force drifts ==
Generally speaking, when there is a force on the particles perpendicular to the magnetic field, then they drift in a direction perpendicular to both the force and the field. If $\boldsymbol{F}$ is the force on one particle, then the drift velocity is
$$\boldsymbol{v}_f = \frac{1}{q} \frac{\boldsymbol{F}\times\boldsymbol{B}}{B^2}.$$

These drifts, in contrast to the mirror effect and the non-uniform B drifts, do not depend on finite Larmor radius, but are also present in cold plasmas. This may seem counterintuitive. If a particle is stationary when a force is turned on, where does the motion perpendicular to the force come from and why doesn't the force produce a motion parallel to itself? The answer is the interaction with the magnetic field. The force initially results in an acceleration parallel to itself, but the magnetic field deflects the resulting motion in the drift direction. Once the particle is moving in the drift direction, the magnetic field deflects it back against the external force, so that the average acceleration in the direction of the force is zero. There is, however, a one-time displacement in the direction of the force equal to (f/m)ω_{c}^{−2}, which should be considered a consequence of the polarization drift (see below) while the force is being turned on. The resulting motion is a cycloid. More generally, the superposition of a gyration and a uniform perpendicular drift is a trochoid.

All drifts may be considered special cases of the force drift, although this is not always the most useful way to think about them. The obvious cases are electric and gravitational forces. The grad-B drift can be considered to result from the force on a magnetic dipole in a field gradient. The curvature, inertia, and polarisation drifts result from treating the acceleration of the particle as fictitious forces. The diamagnetic drift can be derived from the force due to a pressure gradient. Finally, other forces such as radiation pressure and collisions also result in drifts.

=== Gravitational field ===
A simple example of a force drift is a plasma in a gravitational field, e.g. the ionosphere. The drift velocity is
$$\boldsymbol{v}_g = \frac{m}{q} \frac{\boldsymbol{g}\times\boldsymbol{B}}{B^2}$$

Because of the mass dependence, the gravitational drift for the electrons can normally be ignored.

The dependence on the charge of the particle implies that the drift direction is opposite for ions as for electrons, resulting in a current. In a fluid picture, it is this current crossed with the magnetic field that provides that force counteracting the applied force.

=== Electric field ===
This drift, often called the $\boldsymbol{E}\times\boldsymbol{B}$ (E-cross-B) drift, is a special case because the electric force on a particle depends on its charge (as opposed, for example, to the gravitational force considered above). As a result, ions (of whatever mass and charge) and electrons both move in the same direction at the same speed, so there is no net current (assuming quasineutrality of the plasma). In the context of special relativity, in the frame moving with this velocity, the electric field vanishes. The value of the drift velocity is given by
$$\boldsymbol{v}_E = \frac{\boldsymbol{E}\times\boldsymbol{B}}{B^2}$$

=== Nonuniform E ===
If the electric field is not uniform, the above formula is modified to read
$$\boldsymbol{v}_E = \left( 1 + \frac{1}{4}\rho_{\rm L}^2\nabla^2 \right) \frac{\boldsymbol{E}\times\boldsymbol{B}}{B^2}$$

== Nonuniform B ==
Guiding center drifts may also result not only from external forces but also from non-uniformities in the magnetic field. It is convenient to express these drifts in terms of the parallel and perpendicular kinetic energies
$$\begin{align}
K_\| &= \tfrac{1}{2}mv_\|^2 \\[1ex]
K_\perp &= \tfrac{1}{2}mv_\perp^2
\end{align}$$

In that case, the explicit mass dependence is eliminated. If the ions and electrons have similar temperatures, then they also have similar, though oppositely directed, drift velocities.

=== Grad-B drift ===
When a particle moves into a larger magnetic field, the curvature of its orbit becomes tighter, transforming the otherwise circular orbit into a cycloid. The drift velocity is
$$\boldsymbol{v}_{\nabla B} = \frac{K_\perp}{qB} \frac{\boldsymbol{B}\times\nabla B}{B^{2}}$$

=== Curvature drift ===
In order for a charged particle to follow a curved field line, it needs a drift velocity out of the plane of curvature to provide the necessary centripetal force. This velocity is
$$\boldsymbol{v}_{R }= \frac{2K_\|}{qB}\frac{\boldsymbol{R}_{c}\times \boldsymbol{B}}{R_{c}^{2} B}$$
where $\boldsymbol{R}_{c}$ is the radius of curvature pointing outwards, away from the center of the circular arc which best approximates the curve at that point.
$$\boldsymbol{v}_{\rm inertial} = \frac{v_{\parallel}}{\omega_c}\, \hat{\boldsymbol{b}}\times\frac{\mathrm{d} \hat{\boldsymbol{b}} }{\mathrm{d} t},$$
where $\hat{\boldsymbol{b}} = \boldsymbol{B}/B$ is the unit vector in the direction of the magnetic field. This drift can be decomposed into the sum of the curvature drift and the term
$$\frac{v_\|}{\omega_c}\, \hat{\boldsymbol{b}}\times\left[\frac{\partial\hat{\boldsymbol{b}} }{\partial t} + (\boldsymbol{v}_E\cdot\nabla\hat{\boldsymbol{b}})
\right].$$

In the important limit of stationary magnetic field and weak electric field, the inertial drift is dominated by the curvature drift term.

=== Curved vacuum drift ===
In the limit of small plasma pressure, Maxwell's equations provide a relationship between gradient and curvature that allows the corresponding drifts to be combined as follows
$$\boldsymbol{v}_R + \boldsymbol{v}_{\nabla B} = \frac{2K_\| + K_\perp}{qB} \frac{\boldsymbol{R}_c\times\boldsymbol{B}}{R_c^2 B}$$

For a species in thermal equilibrium, $2K_\|+K_\perp$ can be replaced by $2k_\text{B}T$ ($k_\text{B}T/2$ for $K_\|$ and $k_\text{B}T$ for $K_\perp$).

The expression for the grad-B drift above can be rewritten for the case when $\nabla B$ is due to the curvature. This is most easily done by realizing that in a vacuum, Ampere's Law is $\nabla\times\boldsymbol{B} = 0$. In cylindrical coordinates chosen such that the azimuthal direction is parallel to the magnetic field and the radial direction is parallel to the gradient of the field, this becomes
$$\nabla\times\boldsymbol{B} = \frac{1}{r} \frac{\partial}{\partial r} \left( r B_\theta \right) \hat{z} = 0$$

Since $r B_\theta$ is a constant, this implies that
$$\nabla B = - B \frac{\boldsymbol{R}_c}{R_c^2}$$
and the grad-B drift velocity can be written
$$\boldsymbol{v}_{\nabla B} = -\frac{K_\perp}{q} \frac{\boldsymbol{B}\times \boldsymbol{R}_c}{R_c^2 B^2}$$

== Polarization drift ==
A time-varying electric field also results in a drift given by
$$\boldsymbol{v}_p = \frac{m}{qB^2}\frac{d\boldsymbol{E}}{dt}$$

Obviously this drift is different from the others in that it cannot continue indefinitely. Normally an oscillatory electric field results in a polarization drift oscillating 90 degrees out of phase. Because of the mass dependence, this effect is also called the inertia drift. Normally the polarization drift can be neglected for electrons because of their relatively small mass.

== Diamagnetic drift ==
The diamagnetic drift is not actually a guiding center drift and resembles averaged (fluid) behavior of large collection of particles. A pressure gradient does not cause any single particle to drift. Nevertheless, the fluid velocity is defined by counting the particles moving through a reference area, and a pressure gradient results in more particles in one direction than in the other. The net velocity of the fluid is given by

$$\boldsymbol{v}_D = -\frac{\nabla p\times\boldsymbol{B}}{qn B^2}$$

== Drift currents ==
With the important exception of the $\boldsymbol{E}\times\boldsymbol{B}$ drift, the drift velocities of differently charged particles will be different. This difference in velocities results in a current, while the mass dependence of the drift velocity can result in chemical separation.
