= List of laser articles =

This is a list of laser topics.

== A ==
- 3D printing, additive manufacturing
- Abnormal reflection
- Above-threshold ionization
- Absorption spectroscopy
- Accelerator physics
- Acoustic microscopy
- Acousto-optic deflector
- Acousto-optic modulator
- Acousto-optical spectrometer
- Acousto-optics
- Active laser medium
- Active optics
- Advanced Precision Kill Weapon System
- Advanced Tactical Laser
- Afocal system
- Airborne laser
- Airborne wind turbine
- Airy beam
- ALKA
- All gas-phase iodine laser
- Ambient ionization
- Amplified spontaneous emission
- Analytical chemistry
- Aneutronic fusion
- Antiproton Decelerator
- Apache Arrowhead
- Apache Point Observatory Lunar Laser-ranging Operation
- Arago spot
- Argon fluoride laser
- Argus laser
- Asterix IV laser
- Astrophysical maser
- Atmospheric-pressure laser ionization
- Atom interferometer
- Atom laser
- Atom probe
- Atomic clock
- Atomic coherence
- Atomic fountain
- Atomic line filter
- Atomic ratio
- Atomic spectroscopy
- Atomic vapor laser isotope separation
- Audience scanning
- Autler–Townes effect
- Autologous patient-specific tumor antigen response
- Automated guided vehicle
- Autonomous cruise control system
- Avalanche photodiode
- Axicon

== B ==
- Babinet's principle
- Ballistic photon
- Bandwidth-limited pulse
- Bandwidth (signal processing)
- Barcode reader
- Basir
- Beam-powered propulsion
- Beam diameter
- Beam dump
- Beam expander
- Beam homogenizer
- Beam parameter product
- Beamz
- Big Bang Observer
- Biophotonics
- Biosensor
- Black silicon
- Blood irradiation therapy
- Blu-ray Disc
- Blue laser
- Boeing Laser Avenger
- Boeing NC-135
- Boeing YAL-1
- Bubblegram

== C ==
- CLidar
- CALIPSO, Cloud-Aerosol Lidar and Infrared Pathfinder Satellite Observations
- Calligraphic projection
- Calutron
- Carbon dioxide laser
- Carrier generation and recombination
- Catastrophic optical damage
- Cauterization
- Cavity ring-down laser absorption spectroscopy
- Ceilometer
- Chaos in optical systems
- Chemical laser
- Chemical oxygen iodine laser
- Chirped mirror
- Chirped pulse amplification
- Clementine (spacecraft)
- Cloud seeding
- Coherence (physics)
- Coherence length
- Coherence time
- Coherent addition
- Coherent anti-Stokes Raman spectroscopy
- Coherent backscattering
- Coherent perfect absorber, anti-laser
- Coherent spectroscopy
- Collimator
- Colloidal crystal
- Color LaserWriter
- Color engraving
- Common Infrared Countermeasures program
- CD player
- Compatible Toner Cartridge
- Computed tomography laser mammography
- Computer Output to Laser Disc
- Confocal laser scanning microscopy
- Confocal microscopy
- Containment field
- Continuous scan laser Doppler vibrometry
- Continuous wave
- Coordinate-measuring machine
- Copper vapor laser
- Core/Shell Semiconductor Nanocrystals
- Corneal Waveform technology
- Coupling parameter
- Crystal oven
- Cyclic ozone
- Cyclops laser

== D ==
- Dark state
- David Laserscanner
- Dazer Laser
- Dazzler (weapon)
- Defence Research and Development Organisation
- Delayed extraction
- Dental laser
- Detonator
- Diamond anvil cell
- Diamond blade
- Diamond enhancement
- Diamond turning
- Dichroic filter
- Dielectric mirror
- Diffractive beam splitter
- Digital holographic microscopy
- Diode-pumped solid-state laser
- Dipole trap
- Direct laser lithography
- Direct metal laser sintering
- Directed-energy weapon
- Disk laser
- Dispersive prism
- Distributed Bragg reflector
- Distributed acoustic sensing
- Distributed feedback laser
- Distributed temperature sensing
- Dopant
- Doppler cooling limit
- Double-clad fiber
- Double-density compact disc
- Double-slit experiment
- Dual polarization interferometry
- Dumpy level
- Dye laser
- Dynamic Laser Cruise Control
- Dynamic light scattering

== E ==
- Electric spark
- Electro-absorption modulator
- Electro-optic modulator
- Electrolaser
- Electromagnetic radiation
- Electromagnetically induced grating
- Electromagnetically induced transparency
- Electronic countermeasure
- Electronic speckle pattern interferometry
- Electrophoretic light scattering
- Electrophotography
- Electrostatic-sensitive device
- Encircled energy
- Encyclopedia of Laser Physics and Technology
- Endovenous laser treatment
- Energy transfer upconversion
- Enriched uranium
- Er:glass laser
- European x-ray free electron laser
- Evolutionary Air and Space Global Laser Engagement
- Excimer laser
- Extensometer
- Extinction cross
- Extinction ratio
- Extreme Light Infrastructure
- Extreme ultraviolet
- Extreme ultraviolet lithography
- Eye surgery
- Eye testing using speckle

== F ==
- FILAT, Forward-looking Infrared and Laser Attack Targeting
- FLASH
- FROG
- Fabrication (metal)
- Fabry–Pérot interferometer
- Far-infrared laser
- Fast atom bombardment
- Femtosecond Lenticule EXtraction
- Femtosecond laser intrastromal vision correction
- Femtosecond pulse shaping
- Fiber Bragg grating
- Fiber disk laser
- Fiber laser
- Fibre optic gyroscope
- Field-Map
- Figure-8 laser
- Filament propagation
- Fire-and-forget
- Firearm microstamping
- Fixed-point laser sensors
- Flash photolysis
- Flashtube
- Flow cytometry
- Fluorescence cross-correlation spectroscopy
- Fluorescence spectroscopy
- Forced Rayleigh scattering
- Fourier domain mode locking
- 4Pi microscope, a laser scanning fluorescence microscope
- Frame-dragging
- Fraunhofer diffraction
- Free-electron laser
- Free-space optical communication
- Frequency Addition Source of Optical Radiation
- Frequency agility
- Frequency comb
- Frequency-resolved optical gating
- Fuser
- Fusion power
- Fusion splicing

== G ==
- GBU-44/B Viper Strike
- GEKKO XII
- GRENOUILLE
- Gain-switching
- Gain (lasers)
- Galvanometer
- Gamma ray laser
- Gamut
- Gas centrifuge
- Gas dynamic laser
- Gas laser
- Gaser, Gamma Amplification by Stimulated Emission of Radiation
- Gaussian beam
- Geoscience Laser Altimeter System
- Glan–laser prism
- Goniometer
- Grating-eliminated no-nonsense observation of ultrafast incident laser light e-fields, GRENOUILLE
- Grating light valve
- Gravitational wave
- Gravitational wave detector
- Gravity laser
- Guidance system
- Guided Advanced Tactical Rocket – Laser

== H ==
- HDSS
- HD DVD
- HELRAM
- HP LaserJet
- Handheld projector
- Hateruma class patrol vessel
- Heat-affected zone
- Heat treating
- Helium–neon laser
- Heterodyne
- Heterojunction
- HiPER
- High-altitude wind power
- High Energy Liquid Laser Area Defense System
- High Harmonic Generation
- Holographic Versatile Disc
- Holographic grating
- Holographic weapon sight
- Holography
- Holometer
- Homodyne detection
- Homogeneous broadening
- Horizon Laser Vision Center Classic
- Hybrid silicon laser
- Hydrodynamic focusing
- Hydrogen fluoride laser
- Hydroxyl tagging velocimetry

== I ==
- Ion laser

== J ==
- Janus laser

== K ==
- KALI (laser)
- Kerr-lens modelocking
- Kerr effect
- Keyence
- Krasnopol (Weapon)
- Krypton fluoride laser

== L ==
- LAM, Laser Assisted Myringotomy
- LANTIRN, Low Altitude Navigation and Targeting Infrared for Night
- LARES (satellite)
- LCA-Vision
- LCGT
- LED printer
- LFA, Laser flash analysis
- LIDAR, Laser Imaging Detection and Ranging)
- LIDAR speed gun
- LISA Pathfinder
- LITENING targeting pod
- LLM01
- LOMAK, Light Operated Mouse And Keyboard
- LT PGB
- LULI
- LULI2000
- LaSer UK
- Laboratory for Laser Energetics
- Laminated object manufacturing
- Laser
- Laser-assisted new attachment procedure
- Laser-based angle-resolved photoemission spectroscopy
- Laser-doppler flowmetry
- Laser-guided bomb
- Laser-heated pedestal growth
- Laser-hybrid welding
- Laser-induced breakdown spectroscopy
- Laser-induced fluorescence
- Laser ablation
- Laser ablation electrospray ionization
- Laser ablation synthesis in solution
- Laser absorption spectrometry
- Laser accelerometer
- Laser acronyms
- Laser aiming module
- Laser airborne depth sounder
- Laser Arena
- Laser assisted parking
- Laser beam divergence
- Laser beam machining
- Laser beam profiler
- Laser beam quality
- Laser beam riding
- Laser blended vision
- Laser bridge
- Laser broom
- Laser camera system
- Laser cannon
- Laser cautery
- Laser coagulation
- Laser communication
- Laser construction
- Laser converting
- Laser cooling
- Laser crystal
- Laser cutting
- Laser dazzler
- Laser designator
- Laser detector
- Laser detuning
- Laser diffraction analysis
- Laser diode
- Laser diode rate equations
- Laser diode thermal desorption
- Laser Doppler velocimetry
- Laser Doppler vibrometer
- Laser drilling
- Laser dynamic range imager
- Laser Electrical
- Laser engraving
- Laser extensometer
- Laser eye surgery
- Laser fence
- Laser flash analysis
- Laser Focus World
- Laser fusion
- Laser Geodynamics Satellites, LAGEOS
- Laser Ghost
- Laser glass sculpture
- Laser guidance
- Laser guide star
- Laser guided and stabilized arc welding
- Laser guns
- Laser hair removal
- Laser harp
- Laser heater
- Laser imaging
- Laser inertial fusion energy
- Laser Interferometer Gravitational-Wave Observatory, LIGO
- Laser injection
- Laser integration line
- Laser keyboard
- Laser level
- Laser levitation
- Laser light show (Grand Coulee Dam)
- Laser light shows
- Laser line level
- Laser linewidth
- Laser lithotripsy
- Laser machine control
- Laser medicine
- Laser Mégajoule
- Laser melting
- Laser mouse
- Laser microjet
- Laser microphone
- Laser microprobe mass spectrometry
- Laser microscopy
- Laser mode
- Laser oscillation
- Laser photoplotter
- Laser pistol
- Laser plasma acceleration
- Laser pointer
- Laser power beaming
- Laser printer
- Laser propulsion
- Laser protection eyewear
- Laser Radial
- Laser radial keratotomy
- Laser rangefinder
- Laser rapid manufacturing
- Laser reflecting goniometer
- Laser resurfacing
- Laser rot
- Laser safety
- Laser scalpel
- Laser scanner
- Laser scanning
- Laser science
- Laser Science and Technology Centre
- Laser shaft alignment
- Laser shock
- Laser sight
- Laser snow
- Laser soldering
- Laser speckle
- Laser spectroscopy
- Laser spray ionization
- Laser Stratos
- Laser surface velocimeter
- Laser survey
- Laser sword
- Laser table
- Laser tag
- Laser thermal keratoplasty
- Laser thermometer
- Laser trackers
- Laser trimming
- Laser turntable
- Laser tweezer
- Laser vaginal rejuvenation
- Laser video display
- Laser video projector
- Laser voltage prober
- Laserblast
- Laserdisc
- Laserfection
- Laserfilm
- LaserLock
- LaserMotive
- LaserScope
- Lasgun
- LASIK (laser-assisted in situ keratomileusis)
- Lasing threshold
- Laspistol
- Light
- Light-emitting diode
- LightScribe
- Light beam
- Light dressed state
- Light gun
- Light induced voltage alteration
- Light pulse generator
- Light therapy
- Lightcraft
- Lightning
- Line laser
- Liposuction
- Liquid crystal
- Liquid crystal laser
- List of laser applications
- List of laser types
- List of petawatt lasers
- Lloyd's mirror
- Lockheed Martin Sniper XR
- Logitech VX Revolution
- Long path laser
- Longitudinal mode
- Low-angle laser light scattering
- Low level laser therapy
- Lunar Laser Ranging experiment
- Lyot filter

== M ==
- MALDI imaging
- MEMS magnetic field sensor
- MESSENGER
- MIRACL
- M squared
- Madison Symmetric Torus
- Magnetized target fusion
- Magneto-optic Kerr effect
- Magneto-optical drive
- Magneto-optical trap
- Manipulation of atoms by optical field
- Mars Global Surveyor
- Mars Orbiter Laser Altimeter
- Marvin (robot)
- Maser
- Matrix-assisted laser desorption/ionization
- McCumber relation
- Megamaser
- Mercury laser
- Metal aromaticity
- Michelson interferometer
- Microplasma
- Microprobe
- Microscale thermophoresis
- Mirror
- Mirror galvanometer
- Mirror mount
- Missile guidance
- Mobile Tactical High-Energy Laser
- Mode-locking
- Mode coupling
- Mode scrambler
- Modulating retro-reflector
- Molecular laser isotope separation
- Molecular tagging velocimetry
- Monochromator
- Moore's law
- Mosquito laser
- Motion detection
- Multiangle light scattering
- Multifocal multiphoton microscopy
- Multiphase topology optimisation
- Multiphoton intrapulse interference phase scan
- Multiple-prism dispersion theory
- Multiple-prism grating laser oscillator
- Multiple Integrated Laser Engagement System

== N ==
- N-slit interferometer
- N-slit interferometric equation
- NRLMSISE-00
- Nanoimpellers
- Nanolaser
- Nanoneedle
- Nanosecond
- Nanosight
- National Ignition Facility
- Nd:YAG laser
- Nd:glass laser
- NeXT Laser Printer
- Near-field scanning optical microscope
- Negative temperature
- Neutral density filter
- Newton's flaming laser sword
- Nicoll-Dyson Laser
- Nike laser
- Nitrogen laser
- Noble gas
- Noise-immune cavity-enhanced optical heterodyne molecular spectroscopy
- Non-ionizing radiation
- Nonlinear optics
- Novette laser
- Nuclear fusion-fission hybrid
- Nuclear photonic rocket
- Nuclear pumped laser
- Numerical aperture

== O ==
- OMAC Laser 300
- Open fiber control
- Optical Express
- Optical amplifier
- Optical autocorrelation
- Optical beam dump
- Optical beam induced current
- Optical bistability
- Optical cavity
- Optical coherence tomography
- Optical cross section
- Optical decay
- Optical dilatometer
- Optical disc drive
- Optical downconverter
- Optical feedback
- Optical heterodyne detection
- Optical imaging
- Optical interferometry
- Optical lattice
- Optical lift
- Optical media preservation
- Optical microcavity
- Optical modulation amplitude
- Optical modulator
- Optical molasses
- Optical parametric amplifier
- Optical parametric oscillator
- Optical power budget
- Optical pumping
- Optical recording
- Optical ring resonators
- Optical storage
- Optical table
- Optical tape
- Optical train
- Optical tweezers
- Optimax
- Optimized Power Control
- Orbiter Boom Sensor System
- Organic photorefractive materials
- Ormosil
- Oscillator linewidth
- Output coupler

== P ==
- PDLCT
- PITZ
- PVLAS
- Particle-size distribution
- Particle accelerator
- Particle counter
- Particle image velocimetry
- Particle tracking velocimetry
- Pascal Photocoagulator
- Paser
- Pauli exclusion principle
- Pave Spike
- Pave Tack
- Paveway
- Penning trap
- Peresvet
- Personnel Detection Device
- Peter Harrison Planetarium, is a 120-seat digital laser planetarium
- Phased-array optics
- PHASR, Personnel halting and stimulation response rifle
- Phoenix (spacecraft)
- Photoablation
- Photoconductive atomic force microscopy
- Photodarkening
- Photodissociation
- Photodynamic therapy
- Photoelectrochemical processes
- Photoemission spectroscopy
- Photoflash capacitor
- Photofragment-ion imaging
- Photoionization mode
- Photolithography
- Photomixing
- Photon
- Photon Doppler velocimetry
- Photon antibunching
- Photonic-crystal fiber
- Photonic force microscope
- Photonic integrated circuit
- Photonics
- Photonics Spectra
- Photophoresis
- Photoplotter
- Photorefractive effect
- Photothermal effect
- Photothermal spectroscopy
- Planar Doppler velocimetry
- Planar laser-induced fluorescence
- Planetarium projector
- Plasma Acoustic Shield System
- Plasma acceleration
- Plasma channel
- Plasma cutting
- Plasma stealth
- Plasma weapon
- Plastic surgery
- Platesetter
- Plymouth Laser
- Point-to-point laser technology (PPLT)
- Polariton laser
- Polarization ripples
- Polyus (spacecraft)
- Ponderomotive energy
- Population inversion
- Potassium titanyl phosphate
- Pound–Drever–Hall technique
- Power scaling
- Precision-guided munition
- Precision bombing
- Precrash system
- Printed circuit board
- Prism coupler
- Projection keyboard
- Protocol on Blinding Laser Weapons
- Pulsed laser
- Pulse repetition frequency
- Pulsed Energy Projectile, Pulsed Impulsive Kill Laser
- Pulsed laser deposition
- Pulsed power
- Pursuit guidance

== Q ==
- Q-switching
- Q factor
- Quantapoint
- Quantum amplifier
- Quantum cascade laser
- Quantum clock
- Quantum defect
- Quantum dot
- Quantum dot laser
- Quantum heterostructure
- Quantum imaging
- Quantum limit
- Quantum noise
- Quantum tomography
- Quantum well
- Quantum well laser
- Quenching (fluorescence)

== R ==
- Radar
- Radar detector
- Radar gun
- Radial polarization
- Rail inspection
- Rainbow hologram
- Raman cooling
- Raman laser
- Raman microscope
- Raman scattering
- Random laser
- Range imaging
- Rangefinder
- Rare-earth element
- Rave
- Ray transfer matrix analysis
- Raygun
- Rayleigh length
- Reciprocity (photography)
- Recoil temperature
- Reference beam
- Reflectron
- Refrigeration
- Regenerative amplification
- Relative fluorescence units
- Relative intensity noise
- Relativistic electron beam
- Relativistic heat conduction
- Relativistic similarity parameter
- Resolution enhancement technology
- Resolved sideband cooling
- Resonance Raman spectroscopy
- Resonance enhanced multiphoton ionization
- Ring laser
- Ring laser gyroscope
- Rocket-assisted projectile
- Roketsan Cirit
- Ruby laser
- Rydberg ionization spectroscopy
- Rydberg molecule
- Rydberg state
- Rytov number

== S ==
- SCALPEL, Small Contained-Area Laser Precision Energetic Load
- SEAgel
- SWEEPNIK
- Sagnac effect
- SASER, Sound Amplification by Stimulated Emission of Radiation
- Satellite geodesy
- Satellite laser ranging
- Saturated absorption
- Saturated spectroscopy
- Scanning laser ophthalmoscopy
- Scanning voltage microscopy
- Scattering from rough surfaces
- Second-harmonic generation
- Second-harmonic imaging microscopy
- Security seal
- Selective laser melting
- Selective laser sintering
- Self-amplified stimulated emission
- Self-focusing
- Self-mixing interferometry
- Self-phase modulation
- Self-pulsation
- Semiconductor ring laser
- Sensor based sorting
- Serial time-encoded amplified microscopy (STEAM)
- Shearography
- Shielding gas
- Shiva laser
- Shtora
- Sight (device)
- Signal beam
- Silex Process
- Single photon sources
- Sisyphus cooling
- Sisyphus effect
- Skin whitening
- Skyguard (airport defense system)
- Slapper detonator
- Slope efficiency
- Smith–Purcell effect
- Smoke detector
- Smoke screen
- Sniper
- Soft-tissue laser surgery
- Soft laser desorption
- Solar-pumped laser
- Solar sail
- Solid-state laser
- Solid-state dye laser
- Soviet laser pistol
- Space-based solar power
- Space debris
- Spaser, Surface plasmon amplification by stimulated emission of radiation
- Spatial filter
- Spatial light modulator
- Spatially Encoded Arrangement for SPIDER
- Speckle pattern
- Spectrometer
- Spectroscopy
- Speed limit enforcement
- Spontaneous emission
- Stage lighting
- Starfire Optical Range
- Starstreak (missile)
- Static light scattering
- Stealth aircraft
- Stealth technology
- Stereoscopy
- Stimulated emission
- Strainmeter
- Strategic Defense Initiative
- Streamlight
- Strong confinement limit
- Strontium vapor laser
- Structured-light 3D scanner
- Sum-frequency generation
- Sum frequency generation spectroscopy
- Super resolution microscopy
- Supercontinuum
- Supercritical angle fluorescence microscopy
- Superluminescent diode
- Superradiance
- Surface-assisted laser desorption/ionization
- Surround optical-fiber immunoassay (SOFIA)
- SwissFEL
- Synchrotron light source
- Synthetic aperture radar
- Synthetic diamond

== T ==
- TEA laser
- TIALD, Thermal Imaging Airborne Laser Designator Pod
- Tactical High Energy Laser
- Tactical light
- Talbot cavity
- Targeting (warfare)
- Targeting pods
- Taser
- Terahertz radiation
- Terahertz time-domain spectroscopy
- Terra-3
- Tetracene
- Theatrical smoke and fog
- Theodolite
- Thermal blooming
- Thermal laser stimulation
- Thermal shock parameter in the physics of solid-state lasers
- Thermopile laser sensor
- Thin film
- Three-level laser
- Ti:sapphire laser
- Time-of-flight camera
- Time-of-flight mass spectrometry
- Time-resolved spectroscopy
- Time of flight
- Titan laser
- Toda oscillator
- Toner (printing)
- Toner cartridge
- Toner refill
- Tophat beam
- Trabeculoplasty
- Track and trace
- Transistor laser
- Transoral laser microsurgery
- Transparency and translucency
- Transparent ceramics
- Transverse mode
- TriDAR
- Trident laser
- Trotec
- Tunable diode laser absorption spectroscopy
- Tunable laser
- Turbulent diffusion
- Two-dimensional infrared spectroscopy
- Two-photon absorption
- Two-photon excitation microscopy
- Type 87 Chu-MAT

== U ==
- Ultra Density Optical disk format
- Ultracold atom
- Ultrafast laser spectroscopy
- Ultrafast monochromator
- Ultralase
- Ultrashort pulse
- Ultrashort pulse laser
- Ultrasonic flow meter
- Ultraviolet
- Undulator

== V ==
- VORPAL
- VTech Laser 200
- Vector soliton fiber laser with atomic layer graphene
- Veiling-glare laser
- Verdet constant
- Vertical-cavity surface-emitting laser
- Vertical-external-cavity surface-emitting-laser
- Videodisc
- Videometer
- Virgo interferometer
- Visotek
- Volume hologram
- Vulcan laser

== W ==
- Wall-plug efficiency
- Warm dense matter
- Waveguide (optics)
- Wavelength-division multiplexing
- Weapon effects simulation
- Wideband materials
- Wireless energy transfer

== X ==
- X-ray
- X-ray laser
- Xenon chloride laser
- Xerox

== Y ==
- Yb:LuVO4

== Z ==
- ZETA (fusion reactor)
- ZEUS-HLONS (HMMWV Laser Ordnance Neutralization System)
- Zeeman slower
- Zerona
