= OFC =

OFC may refer to:

== Business and financial ==
- Corporate Office Properties Trust, its NYSE ticker symbol
- Offshore financial centre, a term synonymous with a tax haven
- Conduit and sink OFCs, a categorisation of offshore financial centres/tax havens
- Optional federal charter, a proposal to streamline and simplify US insurance regulation
- Ottawa Folklore Centre, a former instrument and music store in Ottawa, Canada

== Media and entertainment ==
- Online Film Critics Society
- Open-face Chinese poker, a Chinese poker variant
- Order from Chaos, a band

== Sport ==
- Oceania Football Confederation
- Kickers Offenbach, a German association football club
- Odisha FC, an Indian professional football club
- OFC Oostzaan, a Dutch association football club
- Orpington F.C., an English non-league football club

== Science and technology ==
- Osteitis fibrosa cystica, a skeletal disease involving the parathyroid glands
- Open fiber control, a telecommunication protocol
- Optical fiber, conductive, a type of optical fiber cable
- Orbitofrontal cortex, a region of the brain involved in decision making and other cognitive functions
- Oxygen-free copper, a copper cable manufacturing process
- Oxy-fuel cutting, a metal cutting process; See Oxy-fuel welding and cutting
- Open Financial Connectivity, a financial transition file format
- Occipitofrontal circumference, a way to measure the fetal head

== Other uses ==
- ofc, an SMS language abbreviation for "of course"
- Officer railway station, Melbourne
- Schenley OFC Whisky, a whisky brand
- Daihatsu OFC-1, car brand
