= Scalpel (disambiguation) =

A scalpel is a surgical instrument used for cutting.

Scalpel may also refer to:

- SCALPEL, a laser-guided bomb produced by Lockheed Martin
- The Scalpel, a commercial skyscraper in London, United Kingdom
- Scalpel (film), a 1977 American thriller film
- Laser scalpel, a scalpel which uses a laser, not a blade, for cutting
- SS-24 Scalpel, an intercontinental ballistic missile
- Scalpel, a character in the Transformers film series
- "Scalpel", a song by Alice In Chains from The Devil Put Dinosaurs Here
