= FDML =

FDML may refer to:

- Flow Description Markup Language, a workflow language
- FileMaker Dynamic Markup Language
- Fourier Domain Mode Locking, a laser modelocking technique
