= Ponderomotive =

Ponderomotive may refer to:

- Ponderomotive energy
- Ponderomotive force
