= Stefan Seeger =

German chemist and academic (born 1962)

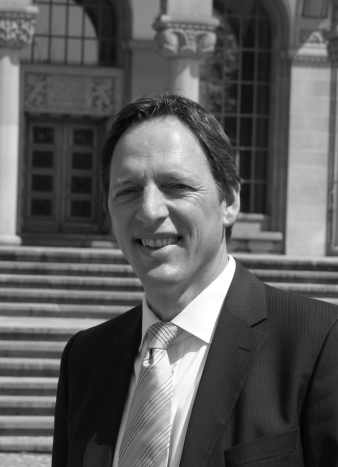
Stefan Seeger

Stefan Seeger (born 11 July 1962, in Michelstadt, Hesse) is a German chemist and professor at the University of Zurich in Switzerland.

== Biography ==
Seeger studied chemistry at University of Heidelberg and Technische Universität Berlin. In 1992, he earned his PhD degree. He later studied Business administration at FernUniversität Hagen. In 1992 he established a research group for biophysical chemistry at the University of Heidelberg. After working as a postdoctoral student at the University of Lund in Sweden, he returned in 1994 to University of Heidelberg to finish his habilitation in 1997. Later that year, he was appointed as a professor for Biosensors at the University of Regensburg. In 1999, he was appointed at University of Zurich to a chair for physical chemistry. In 2001, he was appointed as the director of the Institute for Physical Chemistry.

== Career ==
Seeger invented together with his research group the Supercritical Angle Fluorescence Microscopy method and silicone nanofilaments, such as nanostructured coatings, which show superhydrophobic and superoleophobic properties. He also developed techniques for the manipulation of biological particles. He has so far published more than 100 scientific articles. In addition, he founded Molecular Machines & Industries, Ltd., a supplier of laseroptic systems for pathology, biotechnology and pharmaceutical industry.

He founded a bachelor and master program Chemistry and business administration at University of Zurich, programs teaching high level chemistry and management skills in one program. This programs address professional profiles like general management, logistics, business development, key account manager, etc. in the chemical and related industries.

== Awards and recognition ==
Seeger's silicone nanofilaments were selected as one of the "100 most important innovations of recent years" and affiliated in the Innovation Pavilion of Expo 2010 in Shanghai.

Seeger is a member of the German Society of Chemists, the Swiss Society of Chemists, the American Chemical Society, the Optical Society of America, a board member of the Paul Karrer Foundation, and vice president of the Scientific Research Foundation of the University of Zurich. He is member of the editorial boards of the Journal of Business Chemistry and Advances in Physical Chemistry.

== Selected publications ==
- Enderlein, Jörg; Ruckstuhl, Thomas; Seeger, Stefan (1 February 1999). "Highly efficient optical detection of surface-generated fluorescence". Applied Optics. 38 (4). The Optical Society: 724–732. Bibcode:1999ApOpt..38..724E. doi:10.1364/ao.38.000724. ISSN 0003-6935. PMID 18305670.
- Ruckstuhl, Thomas; Rankl, Michael; Seeger, Stefan (2003). "Highly sensitive biosensing using a supercritical angle fluorescence (SAF) instrument". Biosensors and Bioelectronics. 18 (9). Elsevier BV: 1193–1199. doi:10.1016/s0956-5663(02)00239-7. ISSN 0956-5663. PMID 12788562.
- Li, Qiang; Ruckstuhl, Thomas; Seeger, Stefan (11 May 2004). "Deep-UV Laser-Based Fluorescence Lifetime Imaging Microscopy of Single Molecules". The Journal of Physical Chemistry B. 108 (24). American Chemical Society (ACS): 8324–8329. doi:10.1021/jp0375160. ISSN 1520-6106.
- Ruckstuhl, Thomas; Seeger, Stefan (15 March 2004). "Attoliter detection volumes by confocal total-internal-reflection fluorescence microscopy". Optics Letters. 29 (6). The Optical Society: 569–571. Bibcode:2004OptL...29..569R. doi:10.1364/ol.29.000569. ISSN 0146-9592. PMID 15035473.
- Li, Qiang; Seeger, Stefan (15 March 2006). "Label-Free Detection of Single Protein Molecules Using Deep UV Fluorescence Lifetime Microscopy". Analytical Chemistry. 78 (8). American Chemical Society (ACS): 2732–2737. doi:10.1021/ac052166u. ISSN 0003-2700. PMID 16615786.
- Artus, G. R. J.; Jung, S.; Zimmermann, J.; Gautschi, H.-P.; Marquardt, K.; Seeger, S. (17 October 2006). "Silicone Nanofilaments and Their Application as Superhydrophobic Coatings". Advanced Materials. 18 (20). Wiley: 2758–2762. Bibcode:2006AdM....18.2758A. doi:10.1002/adma.200502030. ISSN 0935-9648. S2CID 137668865.
- Nonella, Marco; Seeger, Stefan (22 February 2008). "Investigating Alanine–Silica Interaction by Means of First-Principles Molecular-Dynamics Simulations" (PDF). ChemPhysChem. 9 (3). Wiley: 414–421. doi:10.1002/cphc.200700546. ISSN 1439-4235. PMID 18232050. S2CID 20126436.
