= Diffractive beam splitter =

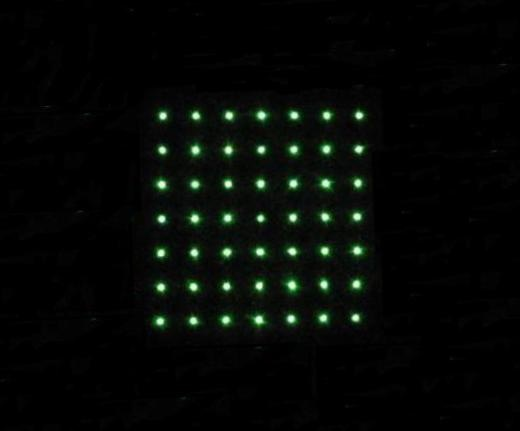
7x7 matrix using green laser and diffractive beam splitter.

The diffractive beam splitter (also known as multispot beam generator or array beam generator) is a single optical element that divides an input beam into multiple output beams. Each output beam retains the same optical characteristics as the input beam, such as size, polarization and phase. A diffractive beam splitter can generate either a 1-dimensional beam array (1xN) or a 2-dimensional beam matrix (MxN), depending on the diffractive pattern on the element. The diffractive beam splitter is used with monochromatic light such as a laser beam, and is designed for a specific wavelength and angle of separation between output beams.

== Applications ==
Normally, a diffractive beam splitter is used in tandem with a focusing lens so that the output beam array becomes an array of focused spots on a plane at a given distance from the lens, called the "working distance". The focal length of the lens, together with the separation angle between the beams, determines the separation distance between the focused spots. This simple optical set-up is used in a variety of high-power laser research and industrial applications that typically include:

- Laser scribing (solar cells)
- Glass dicing (LCD displays)
- Perforation (cigarette filters)
- Beam sampling (Power monitoring and control)
- 3-D motion sensing (Example)
- Medical/aesthetic applications (skin treatment)

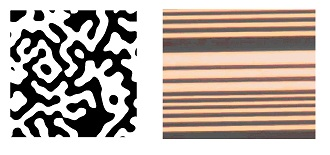
Periodic etch patterns on a)19x19 diff. beam splitter and b)1x31 splitter.

== Design principle ==
The theory of operation is based on the wave nature of light and Huygens' Principle (See also Diffraction). Designing the diffractive pattern for a beam splitter follows the same principle as a diffraction grating, with a repetitive pattern etched on the surface of a substrate. The depth of the etching pattern is roughly on the order of the wavelength of light in the application, with an adjustment factor related to the substrate's index of refraction. The etching pattern is composed of "periods" – identical sub-pattern units that repeat cyclically. The width d of the period is related to the separation angle θ between output beams according to the grating equation:

$$d \sin \theta_m = m  \lambda$$

m represents the order of the diffracted beam, with the zero order output simply being the undiffracted continuation of the input beam.

While the grating equation determines the direction of the output beams, it does not determine the distribution of light intensity among those beams. The power distribution is defined by the etching profile within the unit period, which can involve many (not less than two) etching transitions of varying duty cycles.

In a 1-dimensional diffractive beam splitter, the diffractive pattern is linear, while a 2-dimensional element will have a complex pattern.

For information on manufacturing process, see lithography.
