= Photodarkening =

Optical effect

Photodarkening is an optical effect observed in the interaction of laser radiation with amorphous media (glasses) in optical fibers. Until the 2000s, such creation of color centers was reported only in glass fibers. Photodarkening limits the density of excitations in fiber lasers and amplifiers. The experimental results suggest that operating at a saturated regime helps to reduce photodarkening.

== Definition ==
One could expect the term photodarkening to refer to any process when any object becomes non-transparent (dark) due to illumination with light. Formally, the darkening of the photo-emulsion also could be considered as photodarkening. However, recent papers use this term meaning reversible creation of absorbing color centers in optical fibers. One may expect that the effect is not specific for fibers; therefore, the definition should cover wide class of phenomena, excluding, perhaps, non-reversible darkening of photographic emulsions.

According to the Encyclopedia of Laser Physics and Technology, photodarkening is the effect that the optical losses in a medium can grow when the medium is irradiated with light at certain wavelengths. Photodarkening can also be defined as reversible creation of absorption centers in optical media at the illumination with light.

== Rate ==
The inverse of the timescale at which photodarkening occurs can be interpreted as photodarkening rate.

== Color centers ==
Usually, photodarkening is attributed to creation of color centers due to resonant interaction of electromagnetic field with an active medium.

== Possible mechanisms ==
The phenomenon, similar to photodarkening in fibers, was recently observed in chunks of Yb-doped ceramics and crystals. At the high concentration of excitations, the absorption jumps up, causing the avalanche of the broadband luminescence. Increase of absorption can be caused by formation of color centers by electrons in the conduction band, created by several neighboring excited ions. (The energy of one or two excitations is not sufficient to pop an electron into the conduction band). This explains, why the rate of darkening is strong function of the intensity of the exciting beam (as in the case with optical fibers discussed above). In experiments, thermal effects are important; therefore only the initial stage of the avalanche can be interpreted as photodarkening, and such interpretation is not yet confirmed. A study from 2010 pointed out the role of thulium contamination. Through laser pump and signal absorption, and energy transfer from ytterbium; thulium is able to emit UV light, known to create color centers in silica glass. Although the actual mechanism of photodarkening is still unknown, a reliable setup to test the photodarkening properties of different types of fibers was reported in 2012.
