= Optical beam-induced current =

Optical beam induced current (OBIC) is a semiconductor analysis technique performed using laser signal injection. The technique uses a scanning laser beam to create electron–hole pairs in a semiconductor sample. This induces a current which may be analyzed to determine the sample's properties, especially defects or anomalies.

Conventional OBIC scans an ultrafast laser beam over the surface of the sample, exciting some electrons into the conduction band through what is known as 'single-photon absorption'. As its name implies, single-photon absorption involves just a single photon to excite the electron into conduction. This can only occur if that single photon carries enough energy to overcome the band gap of the semiconductor (1.12 eV for Si) and provide the electron with enough energy to make it jump into the conduction band.

== Uses ==
The technique is used in semiconductor failure analysis to locate buried diffusion regions, damaged junctions and gate oxide shorts.

The OBIC technique may be used to detect the point at which a focused ion beam (FIB) milling operation in bulk silicon of an IC must be terminated (also known as endpoint). This is accomplished by using a laser to induce a photocurrent in the silicon while simultaneously monitoring the magnitude of the photocurrent by connecting an ammeter to the device's power and ground. As the bulk silicon is thinned, the photocurrent is increased and reaches a peak as the depletion region of the well to substrate junction is reached. This way, endpoint can be achieved to just below the well depth and the device remains operational.

== See also ==
- List of laser articles
