= Trident laser =

High-power short pulse laser facility

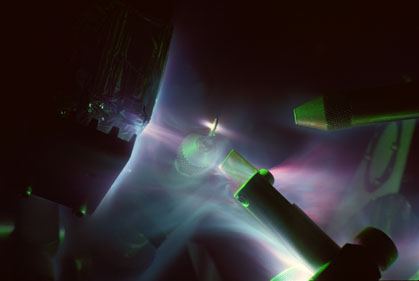
An aluminum foil irradiated by the Trident Laser (entering from the right), producing x-rays, hot electrons, and an ion beam, which cannot be seen directly. The plasma from the intense interaction is visible as the two cones jetting out in either direction from the target (center), expand into the vacuum. X-ray produced plasmas on the surrounding surfaces create glowing structures. The green light illuminating the scene is from the second harmonic light (527 nm) produced from the short-pulse beam's fundamental wavelength (1053 nm) at the target/plasma/laser interface a few tens of micrometres in front of the target.

The Trident Laser was a high power, sub-petawatt class, solid-state laser facility located at Los Alamos National Laboratory (LANL website), in Los Alamos, New Mexico, originally built in the late 1980s for Inertial confinement fusion (ICF) research by KMS Fusion, founded by Kip Siegel, in Ann Arbor, Michigan, it was later moved to Los Alamos in the early 1990s to be used in ICF and materials research. The Trident Laser has been decommissioned, with final experiments in 2017, and is now in storage at the University of Texas at Austin.

The Trident Laser consisted of three main laser chains (A,B, and C) of neodymium glass amplifiers (or Nd:glass), two identical longpulse beams lines, A&B, and a third beamline, C, that could be operated either in longpulse or in chirped pulse amplification (CPA) shortpulse mode. Longpulse beams A and B, were laser chains capable of delivering up to ~500 J at 1054 nm, which were frequency doubled to 527 nm and ~200 J depending on pulse duration; the pulse duration could be varied from 100 ps to 1 μs, and was a unique capability of any large laser in the US (and possibly the world). The third laser chain, beamline C, could produce up to ~200 J at 1054 nm, or could be frequency doubled to 527 nm at ~100 J in the longpulse mode with the same pulse duration variability as beams A and B; or could be used in the Trident enhancement configuration allowing the ~200 J beam to be compressed via CPA to ~600 fs and ~100 J, producing powers on the scale of a quarter petawatt(~200 TW) with a host of laser and plasma diagnostics. A 100 mJ 500 fs probe beamline is also available.

The 200TW shortpulse ultra high-intensity laser system is currently a world record holder in ion acceleration energy with Target Normal Sheath Acceleration mechanism, producing protons at 58.5 MeV from a flat-foil, beating the record of the NOVA Petawatt laser back in 1999; and 67.5 MeV protons from micro-cone targets. Trident delivers Petawatt performance at a fifth of the power. The 200TW or C beam is capable of focusing down to less than 10 micrometers in diameter to reach laser field intensities (irradiance) of ~2 × 10^{20} W/cm^{2}, producing protons over 50 MeV as well as high quality, high energy xrays. The interaction can be diagnosed with a Backscatter Focal Diagnostics similar to a Full Aperture Back-scatter (FABS) diagnostic at the National Ignition Facility. A new front-end for the laser employs a 2nd order cleaning technique, dubbed SPOPA (for Short-Pulse Optical Parametric Amplification) cleaning, which reduces the contrast to better than 10^{−9} ASE intensity ratio, making it one of the cleanest ultra high-intensity high-power laser in the world.

The laser was being used for Fast Ignition ICF research, warm dense matter experiments, materials dynamics studies, and laser-matter interaction research, including particle acceleration, x-ray backlighting and laser-plasma instabilities (LPI).

For more information see the Trident User Facility Website: Trident User Facility, Los Alamos National Laboratory, see the references below and these articles using the laser:

== See also ==
- List of laser articles
