= LULI =

French research laboratory

Coordinates: 48.7130°N 2.2090°E

LULI : Laboratoire pour l'Utilisation des Lasers Intenses (LULI) is a scientific research laboratory specialised in the study of plasmas generated by laser-matter interaction at high intensities and their applications. The main missions of LULI include: (i) Research in Plasma Physics, (ii) Development and operation of high-power high-energy lasers and experimental facilities, (iii) student formation in Plasma Physics, Optics and Laser Physics.

== Research in Plasma Physics ==
Focusing the extreme power of pulsed lasers (up to the petawatt level, 10^{15}W) onto tiny spots, μm to mm in diameter, leads to ultrahigh intensities reaching today 10^{20}W/cm^{2} or more. Targets irradiated at such intensities can reach temperatures of the order of hundred million degrees and pressures of tens of megabars. Moreover, the electric and magnetic fields associated with the laser beam itself or the fields produced in the plasma are responsible for the acceleration of particles to relativistic energies and to the production of intense radiation from THz to x-rays and γ-rays.

The main subjects studied by LULI's scientists include laser inertial fusion and all its physical components (e.g. laser-plasma interaction), fundamental physics of hot and dense plasmas and its applications in astrophysics and geophysics. In the short-pulse picosecond regime, the main developments concern the fast-igniter scheme for inertial fusion, and the production of brief and intense sources of radiation and relativistic particles.

== National and International Facility ==
LULI is the French national civilian facility dedicated to research using high-energy high-power lasers and their applications. French and foreign users have access to the two most energetic French academic laser chains: 100TW and LULI2000.

The main beam of the 100TW facility delivers 30 J in 300 fs at 1.06 μm. It is coupled with additional nanosecond and picosecond beams. Nano2000, the nanosecond version of LULI2000 consists in two laser beams delivering each 1 kJ in nanosecond pulses at 1.06 μm. PICO2000 couples one of these nanosecond beams with a 200 J picosecond beam. Each of these facilities is coupled to a dedicated experimental area.

The development of the laser sources is supported by an important R&D programme in high-power laser related optics and laser technology.

== Student Training ==
LULI trains French and foreign undergraduate and graduate students in plasma physics and laser physics and technology.

== Collaborations ==
Located at École Polytechnique, LULI is a CNRS - CEA - École Polytechnique - Université Pierre et Marie Curie laboratory. It is part of numerous national and international collaborations with research teams and laboratories involved in the development or the utilisation of high-power lasers. The following list includes some French and European contacts and projects.

- Institut Laser Plasma
- Physics Department at 'École Polytechnique
- Centre de Physique Théorique
- Laboratoire d'Optique Appliquée
- CEA - DRECAM
- Confédération des Lasers Intenses du Plateau de Saclay
- Centre Lasers Intenses et Applications
- Laser Alise
- Ligne d'Intégration Laser
- Laserlab-Europe
- Central laser Facility
- PHELIX - GSI
- Extreme Light Infrastructure
- PETAL
- HiPER

== See also ==
- List of plasma physics software
