= Laser converting =

For industrial processes, laser converting or laser digital converting is a Manufacturing "technology that enables device manufacturers to produce features that otherwise would be problematic or even impossible to die-cut, without the need for tooling."

In contrast to traditional mechanical converting, laser digital converting utilizes the features of lasers and advanced software technology to convert parts in extremely high accuracy. In production environment, the laser digital converting is the economics of scale when the production run is short, as there is virtually no 'up-front' cost associated with machine tools making and storage. Also, the turnaround time is minimal as it only involves software interpretation on the imported engineering diagram of the part.

== See also ==
- Laser cutting
- List of laser articles
