= Pound–Drever–Hall technique =

Light-stabilizing technique

The Pound–Drever–Hall (PDH) technique is a widely used and powerful approach for stabilizing the frequency of light emitted by a laser by means of locking to a stable cavity. The PDH technique has a broad range of applications including interferometric gravitational wave detectors, atomic physics, and time measurement standards, many of which also use related techniques such as frequency modulation spectroscopy. Named after R. V. Pound, Ronald Drever, and John L. Hall, the PDH technique was described in 1983 by Drever, Hall and others working at the University of Glasgow and the U. S. National Bureau of Standards. This optical technique has many similarities to an older frequency-modulation technique developed by Pound for microwave cavities.

Since a wide range of conditions contribute to determine the linewidth produced by a laser, the PDH technique provides a means to control and decrease the laser's linewidth, provided an optical cavity that is more stable than the laser source. Alternatively, if a stable laser is available, the PDH technique can be used to stabilize and/or measure the instabilities in an optical cavity length. The PDH technique responds to the frequency of laser emission independently of intensity, which is significant because many other methods that control laser frequency, such as a side-of-fringe lock are also affected by intensity instabilities.

== Laser stabilization ==
In recent years the Pound–Drever–Hall technique has become a mainstay of laser frequency stabilization. Frequency stabilization is needed for high precision because all lasers demonstrate frequency wander at some level. This instability is primarily due to temperature variations, mechanical imperfections, and laser gain dynamics, which change laser cavity lengths, laser driver current and voltage fluctuations, atomic transition widths, and many other factors. PDH locking offers one possible solution to this problem by actively tuning the laser to match the resonance condition of a stable reference cavity.

The ultimate linewidth obtained from PDH stabilization depends on a number of factors. From a signal analysis perspective, the noise on the locking signal can not be any lower than that posed by the shot noise limit. However, this constraint dictates how closely the laser can be made to follow the cavity. For tight locking conditions, the linewidth depends on the absolute stability of the cavity, which can reach the limits imposed by thermal noise. Using the PDH technique, optical linewidths below 40 mHz have been demonstrated.

== Applications ==
Prominently, the field of interferometric gravitational wave detection depends critically on enhanced sensitivity afforded by optical cavities. The PDH technique is also used when narrow spectroscopic probes of individual quantum states are required, such as atomic physics, time measurement standards, and quantum computers.

== Overview of technique ==
Schematic of PDH servo loop to lock the frequency of a laser (top left) to a Fabry–Perot cavity (top right). Light from the laser is sent through a phase-modulator and is then directed upon the cavity. (For diode lasers, fast frequency or phase modulation can be performed by just modulating the diode current, obviating the need for an external electro-optic or acousto-optic phase modulator). The isolator is not involved in the PDH setup; it is present only to ensure that light from various optical components does not reflect back into the laser. The polarizing beamsplitter (PBS) and λ/4 plate act in combination to discriminate between the two directions of light travel: light traveling in the direction left to right passes straight through and on to the cavity, while light traveling in the direction right to left (i.e., from the cavity) is diverted toward the photodetector. The phase modulator is driven with a sinusoidal signal from the oscillator; this impresses sidebands onto the laser light. As described in the section on the PDH readout function, the photodetector signal is demodulated (that is, passed through the mixer and the low-pass filter) to produce an error signal that is fed back into the laser's frequency control port.

Phase modulated light, consisting of a carrier frequency and two side bands, is directed onto a two-mirror cavity. Light reflected off the cavity is measured using a high speed photodetector; the reflected signal consists of the two unaltered side bands along with a phase-shifted carrier component. The photodetector signal is mixed down with a local oscillator, which is in phase with the light modulation. After phase shifting and filtering, the resulting electronic signal gives a measure of how far the laser carrier is off resonance with the cavity and may be used as feedback for active stabilization. The feedback is typically carried out using a PID controller which takes the PDH error signal readout and converts it into a voltage that can be fed back to the laser to keep it locked on resonance with the cavity.

The main innovation of the PDH technique is to monitor the derivative of the cavity transmission with respect to detuning, rather than the cavity transmission itself, which is symmetric about the resonant frequency. Unlike a side-of-fringe lock, this allows the sign of the feedback signal to be correctly determined on both sides of resonance. The derivative is measured via rapid modulation of the input signal and subsequent mixing with the drive waveform, much as in electron paramagnetic resonance.

== PDH readout function ==
The PDH readout function gives a measure of the resonance condition of a cavity. By taking the derivative of the cavity transfer function (which is symmetric and even) with respect to frequency, it is an odd function of frequency and hence indicates not only whether there is a mismatch between the output frequency ω of the laser and the resonant frequency ω_{res} of the cavity, but also whether ω is greater or less than ω_{res}. The zero-crossing of the readout function is sensitive only to intensity fluctuations due to the frequency of light in the cavity and insensitive to intensity fluctuations from the laser itself.

Light of frequency f = ω/2π can be represented mathematically by its electric field, E_{0}e^{iωt}. If this light is then phase-modulated by βsin(ω_{m}t), where ω_{m} is the modulation frequency and β is the modulation depth, the resulting field E_{i} is

$$\begin{align}
E_{\text{i}} &= E_0 e^{i( \omega t+\beta\sin(\omega_\mathrm{m} t))} \\
&\approx E_0 e^{i\omega t} [1+i \beta \sin(\omega_\mathrm{m} t)] \\
&= E_0 e^{i \omega t}\left[1+\frac{\beta}{2}e^{i\omega_\mathrm{m} t}-\frac{\beta}{2}e^{-i \omega_\mathrm{m} t}\right].
\end{align}$$

This field may be regarded as the superposition of three frequency components. The first component is an electric field of angular frequency ω, known as the carrier, and the second and third components are fields of angular frequency ω + ω_{m} and ω − ω_{m}, respectively, called the sidebands.

In general, the light E_{r} reflected out of a Fabry–Pérot two-mirror cavity is related to the light E_{i} incident on the cavity by the following transfer function:

$$R(\omega)=\frac{E_{\text{r}}}{E_{\text{i}}}=\frac{-r_1+(r_1^2+t_1^2)r_2e^{i2\alpha}}{1-r_1r_2e^{i2\alpha}},$$

where α = ωL/c, and where r_{1} and r_{2} are the reflection coefficients of mirrors 1 and 2 of the cavity, and t_{1} and t_{2} are the transmission coefficients of the mirrors.

Simulated plots of a two-mirror Fabry–Perot cavity reflection transfer function and a PDH readout signal. Top: Square magnitude R^{*}R of reflection transfer function; i.e., the reflected power. Middle: Phase arctan[Im(R)/Re(R)] of reflection transfer function. Bottom: PDH readout function V, with demodulation phase φ = π/2. The mirrors of the simulated cavity were chosen to have amplitude reflectivities r_{1} = 0.99 and r_{2} = 0.98, and the cavity length was L = 1 m. The phase modulation frequency of the light was chosen to be f_{m} = 23 MHz (f_{m} = ω_{m}/2π). The portion of the PDH readout function that is useful as a servo error signal is the linear region near f_{res}. The reflected power and the PDH readout function are often monitored in real time as traces on an oscilloscope in order to assess the state of an optical cavity and its servo loop.

Applying this transfer function to the phase-modulated light E_{i} gives the reflected light E_{r}: (Note: The transfer function R is applied independently to each of the three exponential terms because a Fabry–Perot cavity is a linear time-invariant system. The cavity's response to light of frequency ω_{1} is the same regardless of whether it is also simultaneously responding to light of some other frequency ω_{2}.)

$$E_{\text{r}}=E_0\left[R(\omega)e^{i\omega t}+R(\omega+\omega_\mathrm{m})\frac{\beta}{2}e^{i(\omega+\omega_\mathrm{m})t}-R(\omega-\omega_\mathrm{m})\frac{\beta}{2}e^{i(\omega-\omega_\mathrm{m})t}\right].$$

The power P_{r} of the reflected light is proportional to the square magnitude of the electric field, E_{r}^{*} E_{r}, which after some algebraic manipulation can be shown to be

$$\begin{align}
P_{\text{r}} =&\ P_0\left|R(\omega)\right|^2+P_0\frac{\beta^2}{4}\Big\{\left|R(\omega+\omega_\mathrm{m})\right|^2+\left|R(\omega-\omega_\mathrm{m})\right|^2\Big\} \\
&+ P_0\beta\Big\{\textrm{Re}[\chi(\omega)]\cos{\omega_\mathrm{m} t} + \textrm{Im}[\chi(\omega)]\sin{\omega_\mathrm{m} t}\Big\} + (\text{terms in } 2\omega_\mathrm{m}).
\end{align}$$

Here P_{0} ∝ |E_{0}|^{2} is the power of the light incident on the Fabry–Pérot cavity, and χ is defined by

$$\chi(\omega) = R(\omega)R^*(\omega+\omega_\mathrm{m})-R^*(\omega)R(\omega-\omega_\mathrm{m}) .$$

This χ is the ultimate quantity of interest; it is an antisymmetric function of ω − ω_{res}. It can be extracted from P_{r} by demodulation. First, the reflected beam is directed onto a photodiode, which produces a voltage V_{r} that is proportional to P_{r}. Next, this voltage is mixed with a phase-delayed version of the original modulation voltage to produce $V_{\text{r}}'$:

$$\begin{align}
V_{\text{r}}' &= V_{\text{r}}\cos(\omega_\mathrm{m} t+\varphi) \propto P_{\text{r}}\cos(\omega_\mathrm{m} t + \varphi). \\
\end{align}$$

Finally, $V_{\text{r}}'$ is sent through a low-pass filter to remove any sinusoidally oscillating terms. This combination of mixing and low-pass filtering produces a voltage V that contains only the terms involving χ:

$$V(\omega) \propto \textrm{Re}[\chi(\omega)] \cos\varphi + \textrm{Im}[\chi(\omega)]\sin\varphi.$$

In theory, χ can be completely extracted by setting up two demodulation paths, one with φ = 0 and another with φ = π/2. In practice, by judicious choice of ω_{m} it is possible to make χ almost entirely real or almost entirely imaginary, so that only one demodulation path is necessary. V(ω), with appropriately chosen φ, is the PDH readout signal.
