= Polarization ripples =

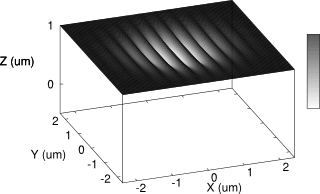
Scheme of periodic structures of nearly 300 nm deep with a period of 800 nm.

Polarization ripples are parallel oscillations which have been observed since the 1960s on the bottom of pulsed laser irradiation of semiconductors. They have the property to be very dependent to the orientation of the laser electric field.

Since the wide availability of femtosecond lasers, such structures have been observed on metals, semiconductors, but also on dielectrics. Moreover, the ripples can reach far sub-wavelength periodicities until 100 nm as recently observed in titanium. The "cumulative" changes occurring from pulse to pulse in the material properties are still under investigation.

== Formation mechanisms ==
The formation mechanisms are still under debate. However, two types of formation mechanisms can be underlined:

- the resonant mechanisms, which are based on electromagnetic aspects, as periodic energy deposition due to roughness, as surface plasmon polariton excitation during the laser illumination;
- the non-resonant mechanisms, more related with thermal consequences of the irradiation of the target by the laser, like capillary waves formed in the melted layer.

The set of resonant mechanisms leading to formation of ripple is defined by the strong link between ripple periodicity and laser wavelength. It includes the excitation of surface electromagnetic wave such as surface plasmon polariton, and surface waves excited by an isolated defect or surface roughness, especially under femtosecond irradiation

An alternative mechanism that assumes the synergy of electron excitation and capillary wave solidification has been also proposed to explain both the formation of ripples and the observed ripple periodicity. An extension of the mechanism was also proposed to account for the development of periodic structures with periodicity larger than the laser beam's wavelength (i.e. grooves) that are formed perpendicularly to the subwavelength-sized ripples; the proposed physical mechanism assumes the erasing of periodic energy deposition followed by the formation of hydrothermal convection rolls that propagate parallel to the electric field polarisation.

The analogy of the structure shape with the solution of Kuramoto-Sivashinsky equations is often mentioned to support different theories such as defect accumulation, or ultrafast modification of the atomic lattice.

== Applications ==
Their interest is about potential applications in building microfluidic channels, changing the color of materials, modifying local electrical properties, and building sub-diffraction-limit optical diffraction gratings.

They also constitute the first stage of the Black Silicon formation process by femtosecond irradiation.
