= Visotek =

American company

Visotek Inc
- Type: Private
- Industry: Photonics
- Founded: 2001
- Headquarters: Livonia, Michigan, United States
- Area served: Worldwide
- Key people: Sheila Jensen (President & CEO)
- Products: Lasers
- Website: Official Website

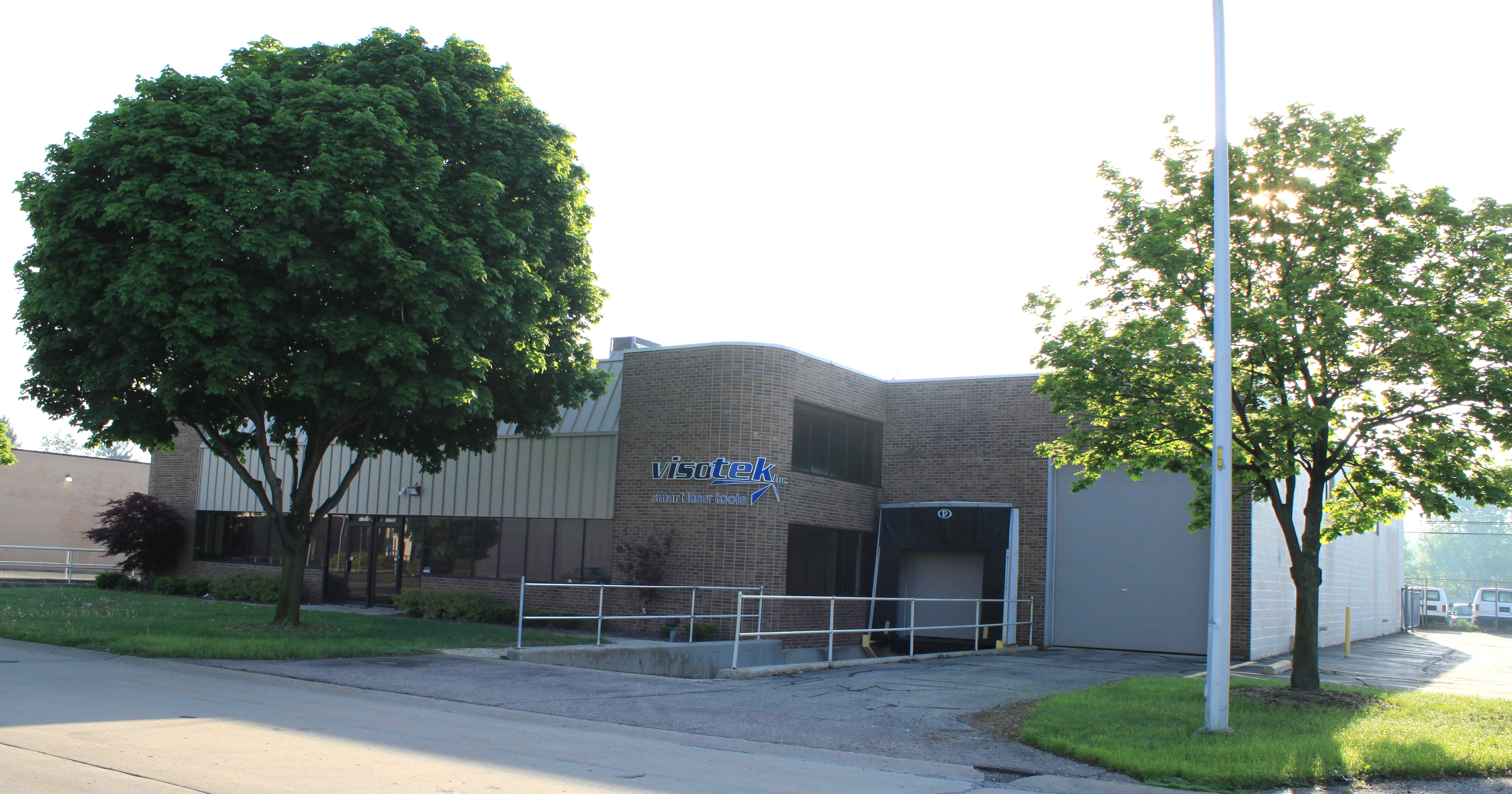
Visotek headquarters

Visotek Inc. is an American company, located in Livonia, Michigan, that designs, develops and manufactures individual fiber coupled diode laser modules, complete turn-key systems and peripheral components used in industrial, military, medical and research applications. Visotek also provides high volume laser processing services and is a Tier Two supplier to the automotive industry, manufacturing up to a half million pieces annually.

== Company profile ==
The company was established in 2001, originally as a spin-off of Fraunhofer USA's Center for Laser Technology (CLT), Plymouth, Michigan. Today, it is a privately held, woman-owned business that works together with its research and development partner, Fraunhofer USA, on various projects to create new laser applications and laser sources for direct materials processing, research, defense and homeland security applications. Under a long term technology transfer agreement, Visotek manufactures fiber coupled diode laser systems patented by Fraunhofer USA and special laser optics.

Since its inception, Visotek's goal has been to address the new technology economy emerging in Michigan. It is concentrating on developing customized systems for laser cladding, laser cleaning, laser welding, laser ablation and laser soldering.

Visotek's DLF Series high powered fiber coupled diode lasers and process expertise are incorporated into the new solid lubricating polymer film technology developed by TriboCoreLogic in Dundas, ON, Canada. After laser curing with the DLF Series System and special optic, this new coating maintains extreme adhesion to a metal substrate and provides a very low coefficient of friction, high load-carrying capacity and exceptional corrosion resistance. A significant advantage of the technology is its chamber-less application and portability of the system, making it highly suitable for surfaces of large, heavy and expensive equipment components, such as turbines, compressors and centrifuge shafts, journal bearings, hydraulic parts. WC seals and pump plungers, etc.

Another core product of Visotek, the lower power DL Series fiber coupled diode laser, has been utilized in advanced technology research performed at the University of Kansas and Western Michigan University in Kalamazoo, MI for "laser-assisted milling of silicon nitride ceramics" and "micro-laser-assisted machining" respectively.

In 2003, based on funding from the Office of Naval Research, Visotek led a team consisting of Fraunhofer USA CLT and Bender Shipbuilding & Repair that enabled Bender to become the first U.S. shipyard to successfully laser weld a structural steel panel from one side, without flipping it over, utilizing the shipyard's production equipment. It was proven that laser welding is not only feasible in shipbuilding; it is the future of welding in shipbuilding. A proprietary special laser processing tool, FLO (Flexibible Laser Optic), was developed for this application that enables rapid two dimensional scanning and auto focus using a variety of laser sources with output powers up to 15 kW. Welding of thick plates with variable weld seam width was achieved, successfully overcoming the gap and tight tolerance fit-up issues. This is a particular breakthrough as the barriers to effective laser welding implementation in shipbuilding are formidable. The same laser processing tool was also successfully applied in the automotive industry for 3-D robotic remote welding. The process achieved 250 welded spots per minute with 6 kW of laser power.

In its newest endeavor, Visotek has partnered with biotherapeutics company, Laser Tissue Welding, Inc. (LTW), to bring new lifesaving surgical techniques to patients in the operating suite and on the battlefield. LTW's patented technology combines laser assisted tissue welding with human serum albumin as the solder, which together quickly stops bleeding and fluid leaks without using mechanical compression, sutures, haemostatic clotting factors (platelets/thrombin/fibrin), or thermal ablation (diathermy/radiofrequency ablation), all of which damage surrounding tissues. A custom DL series laser and handheld optics is being developed by Visotek and tested by LTW so the surgeon can efficiently coagulate an albumin-ICG solder together with a solid transparent albumin scaffold and provide quick and accurate hemostasis and biliary sealing. Special areas of unmet clinical need are rapid hemostasis of solid visceral organs (liver/kidney/spleen) involved in trauma, tumors and transplantation and specifically in patients with coagulation failure or therapeutic anticoagulation.

There are many advantages to the LTW method. It saves lives because it quickly repairs and controls hemorrhage in patients who cannot clot, and it conserves blood based on a lowered requirement for transfusions. The new method is capable of repairing without burning, thus salvaging organs and tissues. It shortens required operating times and the reduced trauma to tissue speeds healing and reduces required hospital stays. This technique simplifies split liver transplants, thereby doubling the liver transplantation pool. The technique is minimally invasive because it is fiber-optically delivered.

Visotek is a second stage start-up company and was nominated by the readers of Corp! Magazine as one of the best companies in Michigan (January/February 2010 print issue of Corp! Magazine and online).
