= Strontium vapor laser =

Strontium vapor laser

A strontium vapor laser is a laser that produces at its output, high-intensity pulsed light at a wavelength of 430.5 nm in the blue-violet region of the visible spectrum via vaporized strontium metal gas contained within a glass tube.

== History ==
Laser action on two of the infra-red transitions in Sr^{+} was first discovered in the Clarendon Laboratory, Oxford by Deech and Sanders as early as 1968. Gain was measured over a 9 cm length of strontium vapor present in a 3 torr buffer gas of helium or neon and maintained at the correct temperature by an externally heated furnace. Three years later, twelve further infra-red laser transitions in neutral strontium were reported by Cahuzac. Again the heat needed to provide sufficient vapor pressure was produced by external means. The tubes used here were 5–10 mm in diameter and 75 cm in length. A 1.25 m cavity was used with mirrors of approximately 98% reflectivity. In 1973, Latush and Sém from Rostov-on-Don State University, Russia, observed visible laser action from the strontium vapor laser for the first time, at wavelengths of 430.5 nm and 416.2 nm. The active volume was contained in a ceramic tube 8 mm in diameter and 60 cm long. Small pieces of strontium were placed inside the tube at equally spaced intervals and the necessary vapor pressure was produced by externally heating the assembly. Helium was used as the buffer gas, at pressures ranging from 2.5–35 torr. Output power was found to increase with increasing buffer gas pressure.

== Population Inversion Mechanism ==
The strontium laser is excited by a high current, pulsed electrical discharge. The gain medium consists of a small amount of strontium vapor held in a relatively high pressure buffer gas of helium. Average gas temperatures are in the region of 800°C.

A capacitor, charged to several tens of kilovolts, is repetitively discharged through the gas mixture. During each discharge pulse through the laser medium the neutral strontium vapor is ionized to Sr^{2+} as the electrons in the outer shell are removed, while only a small fraction of the helium buffer gas is ionized due to its greater ionization potential. On termination of the current pulse, rapid cooling of the electrons occurs, permitting three-body electron-electron-Sr^{2+} collisions to occur to form the most highly excited states of Sr^{+}, as shown:

Sr^{2+} + 2e^{−} → Sr^{+*} + e^{−} + K.E.

The excess kinetic energy evolved in this process is carried away by the third body, an electron. De-excitation of the high-lying energy levels of Sr^{+} then occurs, due to collisions with the remaining free electrons in the plasma. This cascade of recombined electrons, down the Sr^{+} energy levels, continues freely until the 6^{2}S level is reached. The downward transition across the relatively large energy gap, 6^{2}S-5^{2}P, acts as a bottleneck for the electron de-excitation process, which generally proceeds faster for closely spaced levels. A population inversion therefore builds up in the 6^{2}S_{1/2} upper laser level. Inversion occurs between this and the 5^{2}P_{3/2} lower laser level, which is cleared to the metastable and ground levels also by collisions with electrons.
