= Laser spray ionization =

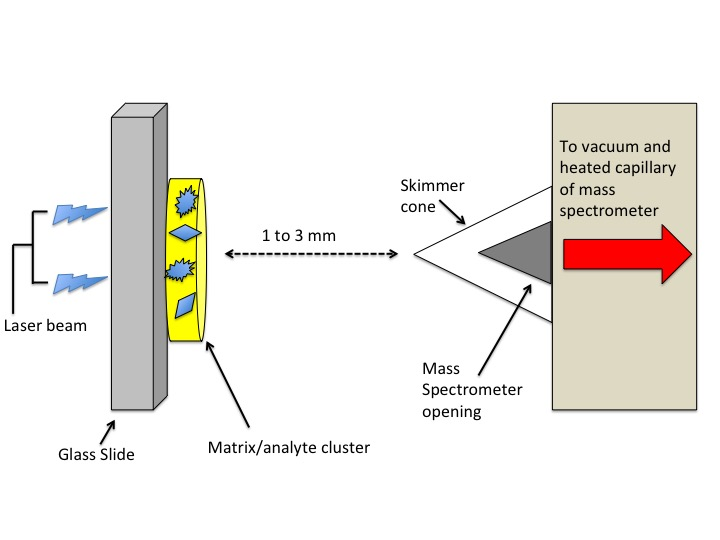
Schematic of LSI

Laser spray ionization refers to one of several methods for creating ions using a laser interacting with a spray of neutral particles or ablating material to create a plume of charged particles. The ions thus formed can be separated by m/z with mass spectrometry. Laser spray is one of several ion sources that can be coupled with liquid chromatography-mass spectrometry for the detection of larger molecules.

== Types of laser spray ionization ==
=== Neutral spray ===
In one version of the laser spray interface, explosive vaporization and mist formation occur when an aqueous solution effusing from the tip of the stainless steel capillary is irradiated from the opposite side of the capillary by a 10.6 μm infrared laser. Weak ion signals could be detected when the plume was sampled through the ion sampling orifice. When a high voltage (3–4 kV) was applied to the stainless-steel capillary, strong ion signals appeared. The ion abundances were found to be orders of magnitude greater than those obtained by conventional electrospray ionization in the case of aqueous solutions. This approach to laser spray ionization is a hybrid of three basic techniques for the generation of gaseous ions from the condensed phase, i.e., energy-sudden activation, nebulization and the action of an electric field.

Laser spray mass spectrometry can faithfully reflect the solution-phase characteristics of biomolecules. It has been successfully applied to evaluate the binding affinities of protein-DNA.

Laser spray has better ionization efficiency than conventional electrospray ionization (ESI). In particular, the sensitivity became more than one order of magnitude higher in negative ion modes. It was also found that this technique has a potential benefit for the low concentration samples due to condensation effect of the formed droplet by the irradiation of laser. Higher the solvation energies of triply charged metal ions, stronger are the signals for ions.

=== Laserspray ionization ===
Laserspray Ionization (LSI) is a newer mass spectrometric technique commonly used with biomolecules, such as proteins. This method is similar to matrix-assisted laser desorption/ionization (MALDI) at atmospheric pressure in that it involves an analyte and matrix mixture. It also contains features from electrospray ionization, in which it produces a similar mass spectra. The mechanism was initially thought to involve laser induced production of highly charge matrix/analyte clusters that upon evaporation of the matrix produces ions by the same mechanism as ESI. LSI's ability to ablate proteins at atmospheric pressure in order to form a multiple of charged ions with a mass resolution of 100,000 when coupled with a quadrupole orbitrap mass spectrometer. The advantages of using LSI includes a solvent-free ionization technique, fast data acquisition, simply to use, and the improved fragmentation through multiple charging.

=== Laser spray inlet ionization ===
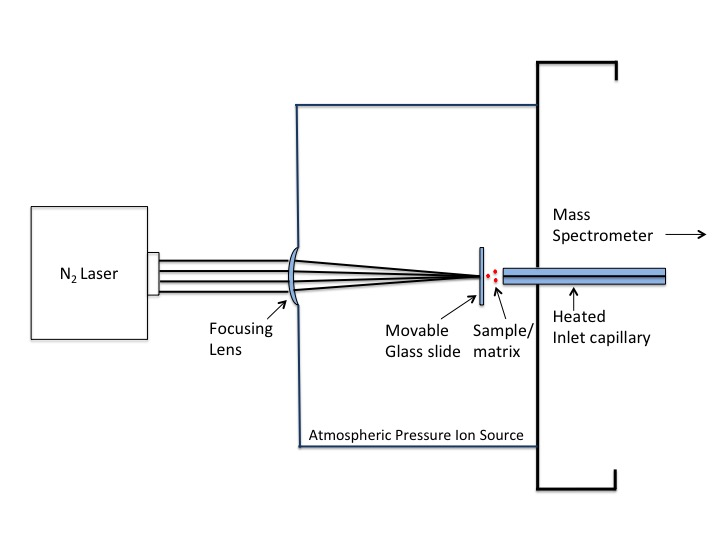
Schematic of LSII

Due to recent innovations to the laser spray technique, a new method of laser ablation using the spray method has surfaced. Laserspray inlet ionization (LSII) involves a matrix/analyte sample at atmospheric pressure being ablated, and the ionization process will take place in an ion transfer capillary tube located in the mass spectrometer inlet. The LSII method is also known as laserspray ionization vacuum (LSIV).

== Applications ==
Matrix-assisted inlet ionization (MAII) has shown that the laser is not necessary for the ionization process. Ions are formed when matrix-analyte is introduced to the vacuum of a mass spectrometer through an inlet aperture. LSI is a subset of MAII and is now called laserspray inlet ionization (LSII). Laser spray inlet ionization and matrix-assisted inlet ionization can be coupled to a fourier transform ion cyclotron resonance (FT-ICR) mass analyzer to improve detection of peptides and proteins.
