= Paser (device) =

A paser (acronym of Particle Acceleration by Stimulated Emission of Radiation) is a device that accelerates a coherent beam of electrons. This process was demonstrated for the first time in 2006 at the Brookhaven National Lab by a team of physicists from the Technion-Israel Institute of Technology.

Relativistic electrons from a conventional particle accelerator pass through a vibrationally excited carbon dioxide medium in which the electrons undergo millions of collisions with excited carbon dioxide molecules and are accelerated in a coherent fashion. No heat is generated in this quantum energy transfer, thus all the energy transferred to the electrons is used in accelerating the electrons. The electron beam created from this process may result in electrons that are highly collimated in velocity in comparison to other acceleration methods.

The vibrationally excited carbon dioxide is the same medium used in a carbon dioxide laser. This medium resonantly amplifies light with a wavelength near 10.6 or 9.4 micrometers, corresponding to a frequency of approximately 30 terahertz. In order to be accelerated, incident electrons must be microbunched at this frequency. An appropriately bunched electron beam strikes excited carbon dioxide molecules resonantly in order to efficiently stimulate energy emission.

== See also ==
- Laser
- Maser
