= Laser pistol =

Laser pistol may refer to:

- Raygun, a science fiction weapon
- Laser pistol (sport), a discipline in some combine sports
- Laser weapon, a directed-energy weapon
- Light gun, a type of controller
