= Laser Electrical =

Laser Electrical was a chain of electrical retail stores operating solely in Northern Ireland, similar to other UK chains such as Currys. It was the largest electrical chain operating exclusively in Northern Ireland, with ten stores. After operating since 1984, it went into administration through KPMG and subsequent liquidation in April 2010, having undergone a management buyout in 2004.

Laser Electrical's e-commerce website was subsequently acquired by Armagh based electrical retailer Dalzell's of Markethill.
