= Autologous patient-specific tumor antigen response =

- Specialty: Oncology

Autologous patient-specific tumor antigen response (apSTAR) technology is a new cancer treatment procedure being developed by IMULAN BioTherapeutics, LLC and Veterinary Cancer Therapeutics, LLC for comparative oncology.

Also known as laser-assisted immunotherapy, apSTAR is an experimental cancer treatment for solid tumors that uses an autologous vaccine-like approach to stimulate immune responses. Specifically, laser-assisted immunotherapy combines laser-induced in situ tumor devitalization with an immunoadjuvant for local immunostimulation.

== Principles of apSTAR ==
The two principles underlying apSTAR are: local destruction of tumor by means of a laser combined with a photo-absorbing dye and stimulated immune response due to the application of an immunoadjuvant, but also due to increases in antigen accessibility caused by the destruction of the tumor. Both elements of this protocol are crucial. Since this method independently triggers the immune response in each individual, it does not depend upon cross reactivity in the expression of tumor-specific antigen between hosts (as is required in conventional antibody immunotherapy and vaccination.)

== Trials ==
Veterinary Cancer Therapeutics, LLC, a subsidiary of IMULAN BioTherapeutics, LLC, is in exploratory trials for canine osteosarcoma, canine melanoma, canine and feline fibrosarcoma, and several other forms of cancer.
