= Ponderomotive energy =

In strong-field laser physics, ponderomotive energy is the cycle-averaged quiver energy of a free electron in an electromagnetic field.

== Equation ==
The ponderomotive energy is given by

$$U_p = {e^2 E^2 \over 4m \omega_0^2}$$,

where $e$ is the electron charge, $E$ is the linearly polarised electric field amplitude, $\omega_0$ is the laser carrier frequency and $m$ is the electron mass.

In terms of the laser intensity $I$, using $I=c\epsilon_0 E^2/2$, it reads less simply:

$$U_p={e^2 I \over 2 c \epsilon_0 m \omega_0^2}={2e^2 \over c \epsilon_0 m} \cdot {I \over 4\omega_0^2}$$,

where $\epsilon_0$ is the vacuum permittivity.

For typical orders of magnitudes involved in laser physics, this becomes:

$U_p (\mathrm{eV}) = 9.33 \cdot I(10^{14}\ \mathrm{W/cm}^2) \cdot \lambda^2(\mathrm{\mu m}^2)$,

where the laser wavelength is $\lambda= 2\pi c/\omega_0$, and $c$ is the speed of light. The units are electronvolts (eV), watts (W), centimeters (cm) and micrometers (μm).

=== Atomic units ===
In atomic units, $e=m=1$, $\epsilon_0=1/4\pi$, $\alpha c=1$ where $\alpha \approx 1/137$. If one uses the atomic unit of electric field, then the ponderomotive energy is just

$$U_p = \frac{E^2}{4\omega_0^2}.$$

== Derivation ==
The formula for the ponderomotive energy can be easily derived. A free particle of charge $q$ interacts with an electric field $E \, \cos(\omega t)$. The force on the charged particle is

$$F = qE \, \cos(\omega t)$$.

The acceleration of the particle is

$$a_{m} = {F \over m} = {q E \over m} \cos(\omega t)$$.

Because the electron executes harmonic motion, the particle's position is

$$x = {-a \over \omega^2}= -\frac{qE}{m\omega^2} \, \cos(\omega t) = -\frac{q}{m\omega^2} \sqrt{\frac{2I_0}{c\epsilon_0}} \, \cos(\omega t)$$.

For a particle experiencing harmonic motion, the time-averaged kinetic energy is

$$U = \textstyle{\frac{1}{2}}m\omega^2 \langle x^2\rangle = {q^2 E^2 \over 4 m \omega^2}$$.

In laser physics, this is called the ponderomotive energy $U_p$.

== See also ==
- Ponderomotive force
- Electric constant
- Harmonic generation
- List of laser articles
