= Point-to-point laser technology =

Point-to-point laser technology (PPLT) refers to a technology that enables a user or surveyor to survey or capture a building's geometry in real time or while on site by translating laser range finder data directly into a Computer-aided design (CAD) or building information models (BIM) work station.

== Applications ==
Most commonly used for as-built and existing conditions documentation or converting the built environment into a digital format.

== Benefits ==
PPLT has many benefits in creating BIM or (CAD) models. Entering data directly into a CAD- or BIM-enabled work station allows a user or 'surveyor' to capture and confirm a building's geometry on site. This effectively builds a digital model of a building while it is being measured enabling not only speed but accuracy. Additionally, building in real time can eliminate the need for revisits and also minimizes the need for future interpretation and manipulation of measurements and data by a CAD operator.

== Associations ==
Since PPLT mainly deals with building surveying there are a few associations that are building surveying specific. There is the Association of Professional Building Surveyors (APBS) in the United States and the Royal Institution of Chartered Surveyors (RICS) in Britain. Whereas building surveying is offered at the curriculum level in Europe it still is in its nascent stages in the United States.

== Certifications ==
Both the APBS and RICS offer certification methods and programs. The APBS has the professional building surveyor (PBS) certifications.
