= Evolutionary Air and Space Global Laser Engagement =

US Air Force missile defence plan

The Evolutionary Air and space Global Laser Engagement (EAGLE) is a missile defence plan being developed by the United States Air Force. It is a "space-based weapon".

The project is a combination of two separate missile defense efforts: the Aerospace Relay Mirror System and a new, high-altitude airship. The project is designed as a means to destroy enemy missiles before they would have the opportunity to hit targets on American soil. It involves using either ground-based, air-based or space-based lasers deflected off a massive airship (roughly 25 times the size of the Goodyear Blimp) covered in mirrors that could destroy missiles but also satellites or spacecraft in a low Earth orbit. By synergistically employing airborne, terrestrial, or space-based lasers in conjunction with space-based relay mirrors, this innovative approach substantially enhances the capabilities of both the Airborne Laser and Ground-Based Laser. The system effectively projects varying laser powers and frequencies, enabling a wide array of effects, ranging from illumination to destruction.

The first tests of the airship were scheduled to begin in 2006. Its current status as of 2011 is unknown.
