= Optical modulation amplitude =

In telecommunications, optical modulation amplitude (OMA) is the difference between two optical power levels, of a digital signal generated by an optical source, e.g., a laser diode.

It is given by

$$\text{OMA} = P_1 - P_0 \,$$

where P_{1} is the optical power level generated when the light source is "on," and P_{0} is the power level generated when the light source is "off." The OMA may be specified in peak-to-peak mW.

The OMA can be related to the average power $P_{\text{av}} = (P_1+P_0)/2$ and the extinction ratio $r_{e} = P_{1}/P_{0}$

$$\text{OMA} = 2 P_{\text{av}} \frac{r_{e}-1}{r_{e}+1}$$

In the limit of a high extinction ratio, $\text{OMA} \approx 2P_{\text{av}}$. However, OMA is often used to express the effective usable modulation in a signal when the extinction ratio is not high and this approximation may not be valid.

== See also ==
- Optical modulator
