= Laser rapid manufacturing =

Laser Rapid Manufacturing (LRM) is one of the advanced additive manufacturing processes that is capable of fabricating engineering components directly from a solid model.

== Technique ==
In this technique, a solid model of the component to be fabricated is made either by 3D imaging system or by designer using computer-aided design (CAD) software or by math data as an output of numerical analysis. Thus obtained model is sliced into thin layers along the vertical axis. The thin layers are converted into corresponding numerical controlled (NC) code and are sent to LRM station in suitable format (e.g. G&M code). LRM station employs a laser beam as a heat source to melt a thin layer on the surface of the substrate/deposited material and fed material to deposit a new layer as per shape and dimensions defined in NC code. A number of such layers deposited one over another and it results in three-dimensional (3D) components directly from the solid model.

== Benefits ==
LRM eliminates many manufacturing steps such as materials-machine planning, man-machine interaction, intermittent quality checks, assembly and related human errors etc. Therefore, LRM offers many advantages over conventional subtractive techniques, such as reduced production time, better process control and capability to form functionally graded parts. It is also an attractive candidate for refurbishing applications because of low heat input, limited dilution with minimal distortion and capability of adding finer near-net shaped features to the components.

== Similar techniques ==
Manufacturing techniques, similar to LRM, are being developed with different names at various laboratories, such as Laser Engineered Net Shaping (LENSTM) at Sandia National Laboratories (USA), Freeform Laser Consolidation at National Research Council (Canada), Selective Laser Powder Remelting (SLPR) at Fraunhofer Society (Germany), Selective Laser Cladding (SLC) at the University of Liverpool (UK), Shape deposition Manufacturing (SDM) at Stanford University (USA), Direct Metal Laser Sintering (DMLS) at Electrolux Rapid Development (Finland), Direct Metal Deposition at the University of Michigan, Automated Laser Fabrication (ALFa) at the University of Waterloo, Canada etc.
