= Forced Rayleigh scattering =

Forced Rayleigh scattering (FRS) is an experimental method in physics and chemistry based on light scattering and is usually used to measure diffusion on length scales of roughly 10 μm. Many FRS experiments have been carried out on thermal and mass diffusion in liquids, and thermophoresis (Soret effect) has been measured in polymer solutions.

The FRS method employs the interference fringes of two absorbed coherent “pump” laser beams within the sample to create a spatially sinusoidal variation in the temperature and, if dye molecules are present, the population of long-lived excited dye states. A third “probe” laser is incident at a wavelength at which the (complex) index of refraction n is different in the bright and dark regions of the interference pattern, so that the periodic variation in n serves as a diffraction grating for the probe beam. A photodetector is used to measure the diffracted light, and after the pump beams are turned off, the detected signal decays at an exponential rate proportional to the relevant diffusion coefficient(s).

FRS studies of molecular mass diffusion are somewhat more involved than studies of thermal diffusion or thermophoresis because the ground and excited dye states may have different diffusion coefficients. When this is the case, two gratings differing in phase by 180 degrees are present: the excited state grating and a complementary ground-state grating. The diffracted signal is then a combination of two exponential decays rather than one. Although unique determination of the two separate diffusion coefficients is not easy, the average of the two diffusion coefficients can be obtained from the diffracted signal without difficulty.
