= SCALPEL =

Lockheed Martin self-funded guided munition program

SCALPEL (Small Contained-Area Laser Precision Energetic Load) is a laser-guided bomb produced by Lockheed Martin. The weapon is being developed from the Enhanced Laser Guided Training Round (E-LGTR) which is the training version of the Paveway II series of bombs. The rationale behind the system is to provide a light, low-collateral damage weapon which can utilise the infrastructure and platform integration already in place for the E-LGTR system. On 14 March 2010, the US Navy announced its intention to purchase Scalpel. The Navy completed some integration work in 2011 and the weapon was still self-funded as of 2016, but Scalpel could be ready for operations in "a year or two" depending if a launch customer commits extra funding and test range support. The Scalpel Plus version has a dual-mode SAL/GPS guidance system.

== Specifications ==
- Weight: 100 lbs (45.3 kg)
- Length: 75 in (1905 mm)
- Diameter: 4 in (102 mm)
- Guidance: Semi-active laser homing.

== Program status ==
- May 2008 – Three inert weapons successfully carried and released by AV-8B Harriers.

== See also ==
- List of laser articles
