= Multifocal multiphoton microscopy =

Multifocal multiphoton microscopy is a microscopy technique for generating 3D images, which uses a laser beam, separated by an array of microlenses into a number of beamlets, focused on the sample. The multiple signals are imaged onto a CCD camera in the same way as in a conventional microscope. The image rate is determined by the camera frame rate, depending on the readout rate and the number of pixels and may range well above 30 images/s.

By exploiting specific properties of pulsed-mode multiphoton excitation the conflict between the density of the foci, i.e. the degree of parallelization, and the axial sectioning has been resolved. The laser pulses of neighboring foci are temporally separated by at least one pulse duration, so that interference is avoided. This method is referred to as time-multiplexing (TMX). Moreover, with a high degree of time multiplicity, the interfocal distance can be reduced to such an extent that lateral scanning becomes obsolete. In this case axial scanning is sufficient to record a 3D-image.
