= Quantum defect (lasers) =

In laser engineering, the quantum defect refers to the shift in frequency between the pump beam and the output radiation.

The energy of a pump photon is generally higher than that of a signal photon (photon of the output radiation). The energy difference is lost to heat, which may carry away the excess entropy delivered by the multimode incoherent pump.

The quantum defect of a laser can be defined as the part of the energy of the pumping photon which is lost (not turned into photons at the lasing wavelength) in the gain medium during lasing. At given frequency $\omega_{\rm p}$ of pump and given frequency $\omega_{\rm s}$ of lasing, the quantum defect $q = \hbar \omega_{\rm p} - \hbar\omega_{\rm s}$. Such a quantum defect has dimensions of energy. The (dimensionless) relative quantum defect may also be defined as follows: at a given frequency $\omega_{\rm p}$ of pump and given frequency $\omega_{\rm s}$ of lasing, the quantum defect $q = 1 - \omega_{\rm s}/\omega_{\rm p}$.

For the efficient operation, the temperature of the gain medium (measured in units of energy) should be small compared to the quantum defect. At a fixed pump frequency, the higher the quantum defect, the lower is the upper bound for the power efficiency.
