= Color engraving =

Color Laser Engraving is a marking process that uses a MOPA fiber laser source to mark color on a metal surface, such as stainless steel or titanium.

Color marking in this way is not often used as it can be a laborious process, impermanent and is costly - largely due to the machinery involved.

MOPA refers to a configuration consisting of a master laser (or seed laser) and an optical amplifier to boost the output power. A special case is the master oscillator fiber amplifier (MOFA), where the power amplifier is a fiber device. In other cases, a MOPA may consist of a solid-state bulk laser and a bulk amplifier, or of a tunable external-cavity diode laser and semiconductor optical amplifier.
