= Nanoimpellers =

Nanoimpellers are an experimental technology developed to eliminate some of the harmful effects of chemotherapy by facilitating treatment of only specific areas of the body. Nanoimpellers are nanoscale, light-activated containers filled with cancer-fighting drugs that only release their contents when hit by a specific type of laser.

Nanoimpellers for cancer drug delivery were first demonstrated in 2008. Initial work used ultraviolet light, however the low penetration in tissue and potential for toxicity mean this is not well suited for delivery in patients. Later work has shifted to using near infrared light and two photon excitation (TPE) to trigger release.

== See also ==
- Nanochemistry
- Two-photon excitation microscopy
