= Ottawa Folklore Centre =

Instrument and music store in Ottawa, Canada

The Ottawa Folklore Centre (OFC) was an instrument and music store in Ottawa, the national capital of Canada. It closed in July 2015 due to bankruptcy.

It mostly sold stringed instruments, such as guitars, banjos, basses, and many uncommon ethnic instruments. They sold mostly acoustic guitars, however, they also sold electric guitars and amplifiers.

The Ottawa Folklore Centre published books of Canadian music. Titles included: Coast to Coast Fever (out of print); All the Diamonds, an early collection of songs by Bruce Cockburn; The Stan Rogers Songbook; Roma McMillan's Valley Waltzes (out of print); Rumours of Glory, the second collection of songs by Bruce Cockburn; The Canadian Pub Caroler, edited by Shelley Posen four-part rare Christmas songs; Maddie's Beginner Tin Whistle Method and The Music of Canoesongs.
