= Photonic force microscope =

Photonic force microscopy (PFM) is an optical-tweezers-based microscopy technique. A small dielectric particle (20 nm to several micrometres) is held by a strongly focused laser beam.

The forward scattered light, i.e. the light whose orientation is slightly changed while passing through the particle, and unscattered light are collected by a lens and projected onto a Quadrant Photo-Diode (QPD), i.e. a Position sensitive device (PSD). These two components interfere in the detector and produce signals, which permit the detection of the bead's position in three dimensions. The precision is very good (as low as 0.1 nm) and the recording speed is very high (up to 1 MHz). Brownian motion deflects the bead from the resting position. A time sequence of measured positions allows one to derive the optical potential in which the particle is held.

The PFM is sensitive to the environment of the particle and has been used in a variety of different experiments that e.g. monitor space that can be filled by particles inside agarose or the fate of small latex beads captured by macrophages.

A similar concept of scanning a bead with an optical trap over a surface was invented in 1993 by Ghislain and W. W. Webb. The name of photonic force microscope was first used in 1997 by Ernst-Ludwig Florin, Arnd Pralle, J. Heinrich Hoerber and Ernst H.K. Stelzer during their stays at EMBL, when they developed 3D position detection and began using the Brownian motion as scanner.

== Commercial PFM system ==
- Elliot Scientific Ltd.
- JPK Instruments
