= Plasma Acoustic Shield System =

The Plasma Acoustic Shield System, or PASS, is in the process of being developed by Stellar Photonics. The company received a $2.7 million contract from the U.S. Government to build the PASS. It is part of a project supervised by the United States Army Armament Research, Development and Engineering Center. The laser was first tested in 2008, and will continue to be tested into 2009, with the testing of turret-mounted PASS.

== Function ==
The device is able to disorient an enemy using a series of mid-air explosions, and may also use "high-power speakers for hailing or warning, and a dazzler light source" Its low power would mean that it would be unable to do significant damage to a specific enemy. While it would not be classified as a weapon, because of its inability to stun or disable a target, its distracting light or explosions are hoped to impede the progress of those in its path. "The [PASS] creates a “mid-air plasma ball” that “basically ignites the air in front of the person...It creates fireworks right in front of you.”

== Description ==
The PASS uses Synchronized Photo-pulse Detonation (SPD), a technology researched by Stellar Photonics wherein two short but powerful laser pulses first create a ball of plasma, then a supersonic shockwave creates a flash and a loud bang. PASS is the first functioning SPD weapon system, and it may lead to the construction of a "man-portable tuneable laser weapon that could be used in both non-lethal and lethal modes".
