= Laser blended vision =

Eye treatment

- Specialty: Ophthalmology

Laser blended vision is a laser eye treatment which is used to treat presbyopia (ageing eyes; progressive loss of the ability to focus on nearby objects) or other age-related eye conditions. It can be used to help people that simply need reading glasses, and also those who have started to need bifocal or varifocal spectacle correction due to ageing changes in the eye. It can be used for people who are also short-sighted (myopia) or long-sighted (hyperopia) and who also may have astigmatism.

Primarily the treatment is for a condition called presbyopia. Laser Blended Vision can be achieved through laser eye surgery, usually performed as LASIK, although surface laser eye surgery PRK or LASEK can be used to produce the effect. Laser Blended Vision works by increasing the depth of field of each eye through subtle changes in the optics of the corneal spherical aberration. The increase in depth of field allows for the eyes to be corrected in such a way that the dominant eye is set for distance and intermediate vision while the non-dominant eye sees best in the intermediate to near range. Because of the similarity in the visual performance of each eye in the intermediate range the brain is able to fuse the images between the eyes rendering a binocular visual environment. This is in contradiction to traditional monovision where the image disparity between the eyes is too high for image fusion by the brain and instead the brain needs to apply suppression of the blurred eye in order to perceive a clear visual field. In Laser Blended Vision, the eyes are effectively working together to allow good vision at near, intermediate and far, without the use of glasses. The effects of Laser Blended Vision tend to last between 5 and 10 years but can be further adjusted by enhancement procedures.

== Advantages of treatment ==
Laser blended vision provides a range of benefits, particularly in comparison to traditional monivision solutions, such as bifocal glasses or contact lenses.The key advantage of Laser blended vision is the freedom from reading glasses. Between 95% and 98% of Laser Blended Vision patients can read normal newsprint and between 80% and 96% can read the very smallest print on medicine bottle inserts (J1 or N4 print size).,

There is a creation of intermediate and far-intermediate distance zone of binocular fusion, allowing the merging of images from each eye in the brain so no dissociation occurs between the eyes as with monovision. Due to increased depth of field in both eyes, the distance vision is significantly better than would otherwise be anticipated.

Laser Blended Vision is a shape profile modification to the standard excimer laser eye surgery method that has been performed tens of millions of times worldwide, mostly as LASIK. LASIK provides a very high level of safety particularly when employing femtosecond laser flap creation (IntraLASIK) and eye tracker technology that tracks eye position at a feedback frequency significantly higher than the repetition rate of the excimer laser pulses themselves.

Over the last ten years, refractive clear lens exchange has become a more common procedure for correcting presbyopia. Refractive clear lens exchange is basically the same surgery as that was previously only designated for eyes with visually impairing cataract, however it is now performed in eyes without cataract (i.e. a clear lens) for the purposes of gaining independence from glasses. A significant advantage of Laser Blended Vision is that it does not involve a surgery that requires entering the inside of eye, a requirement for all other intraocular lens alternatives that involve either intraocular lens monovision or the use of multifocal intraocular lenses. In contrast, Laser Blended Vision is generally more accurate at hitting the refractive target than intraocular lenses, and if target is not achieved, it is adjustable by a simple enhancement procedure (again, without entering the eye).

== Procedure ==
=== Preoperative screening ===
During the preoperative screening, a complete examination of the eye is carried out at a consultation with the surgeon to determine if a patient is suitable for Laser Blended Vision treatment. The dominant eye is determined and vision tested to identify the level of correction required for distance and near on the dominant eye and non-dominant eye. The analysis of ocular dominance and patient specific interocular suppression and binocular rivalry also allows for ensuring the eyes can work together to create the Laser Blended Vision effect.

Unlike with monovision surgery where it is generally advised to perform a "monovision contact lens trial", Laser Blended Vision screening does not incorporate this as it would automatically exclude many suitable candidates from having the procedure. This is because a much larger proportion of people are suitable for Laser Blended Vision (>95%) than monovision (59-67%).

=== During Surgery and Post Operative ===
During the surgery, a corneal flap is created, during which there can be a sensation of slight pressure on the eye during the procedure.

The non-dominant eye is covered and the dominant eye is opened and kept open by a speculum, the corneal flap is lifted and the laser correction is done – an ultra thin flap can be created for treatment of very high prescriptions. The flap is replaced and the speculum is removed. The dominant eye is treated next. The software data for each eye is stored in the Carl Zeiss Meditc MEL 80 laser and delivered by the eye-tracker controlled computer generated excimer laser pulses. The laser time for each eye is usually under 30 seconds. The dominant eye is mainly corrected for distance and intermediate vision and the non-dominant eye is corrected for intermediate and near vision, by increasing the depth of focus for each eye.

The entire procedure takes approximately 20 minutes for both eyes and the visual recovery is rapid and there is very little discomfort afterwards, usually described as if contact lenses had been left in for too long. The flap seals down usually within a few hours and the early postoperative recovery period usually about 7 days during which care is needed to not rub eyes and to wear eye shields during the night. The results are almost instantly available to the patient, where objects and people will seem more in focus, and most people can return to work the next day after their postoperative day 1 check.

== Suitability of treatment ==
Laser blended vision treatment is suitable for people with presbyopia. People mostly develop presbyopia, refractive error between the ages of 40 and 45 years. As we age, the natural lens inside the eye grows, leading to a decrease in the ability of the eye to change its focus from distance to near, a process called accommodation (accommodation (eye)). There is still much controversy amongst experts as to the mechanism of accommodation of the eye, which is probably why the actual reversal of presbyopia is still not medically possible.

Laser Blended Vision is suitable in general for anyone with presbyopia who is also a candidate for corneal laser eye surgery; the range of preoperative prescriptions that can be treated varies, but results have been published for laser blended vision using the Carl Zeiss Meditec MEL80 excimer laser for myopia (short-sightedness) up to -8.50D with astigmatism, hyperopia (long-sightedness) up to +6.00D with astigmatism and for patients who have emmetropia (good distance vision) but only need reading glasses for computers or near vision.

Laser Blended Vision can also be performed after cataract surgery in order to increase the independence from spectacles. Similarly, cataract surgery can be performed together with Laser Blended Vision to provide a patient with better spectacle independence than can be afforded by simple monovision and without the decrease in quality of vision that is produced by a Multifocal intraocular lens. Multifocal intraocular lenses work by splitting the light entering the eye into different focal planes, hence resulting in an eye that never achieves 100% of light at distance or near, however these are increasingly commonly employed for the correction of presbyopia.

== Treatment results ==
Patients treated using Laser Blended Vision, have an increased depth of field compared to traditional monovision. With use of contact lens monovision there is a diminishing effect on distance vision, depth of field and contrast sensitivity (neural subtraction) which is not seen with Laser Blended Vision; in fact Laser Blended Vision has been shown to provide better distance vision binocularly than with the dominant distance eye alone (neural summation). According to a comprehensive review of the medical literature conducted by Dr. BJ Evans, only 59-67% of patients are tolerant to mono vision, compared to the tolerance to Laser Blended Vision in more than 95% of patients screened and treated.

A year after Laser Blended Vision LASIK, approximately 95% of patients achieved 20/20 vision at distance while able to read newsprint type size at near.

== Limitations and potential complications ==
The aim of this surgery is to produce one eye that sees mostly at distance, but still at near and the other eye that sees mostly at near, but also at distance. There is a period of adaptation to Laser Blended Vision which varies from a few weeks to up to a year; according to a study published in the Journal of Refractive Surgery by Professor Dan Reinstein and colleagues, the average patient is adapted within three months of treatment, and at one year 3% were not yet fully adapted. During adaptation patients may feel that the distance vision is strange, and this can produce some slight dizziness or visual discomfort in the initial phases for which a pair of glasses that reverse the difference between the eyes are prescribed.

The risks and complications of Laser Blended Vision are identical to those of LASIK laser eye surgery as such. Laser Blended Vision does not carry specific increased serious risks relative to the standard LASIK laser eye surgery itself. As with all laser eye procedures, patients must familiarize themselves with the risks and side effects of the treatment, which is best done in consultation with an expert laser eye surgeon who performs the Laser Blended Vision procedure as a routine in his practice.

Because of the improved control of induced spherical aberration the excimer laser employing Laser Blended Vision software enables treatment of higher levels of myopia without removing high amounts of corneal tissue,. After the procedure, artificial tears and antibiotic eye drops are used for at least a week which can cause temporary blurred vision and irritation. The sensation of dryness of the eyes is a common side-effect of LASIK and can be uncomfortable for anywhere from a few weeks to a few months after the surgery; most patients use artificial tears for this period of time after LASIK.

Presbyopia is not reversed by Laser Blended Vision, which is a highly effective treatment but not a cure and as presbyopia is a progressive condition, a boost may be required some years after treatment. Typically the effects of Laser Blended Vision surgery last between 5 and 10 years and most patients are able to have an enhancement procedure to recover the benefits of the initial procedure.
