= HELRAM =

The Northrop Grumman High Energy Laser for Rockets, Artillery and Mortars (HELRAM) system is a ground-based directed energy weapon intended to be used mainly against short-range ballistic targets.

It is supposed to be able to shoot down mortar bombs, rocket-propelled mortar bombs, artillery shells and artillery rockets by pointing a high-energy laser beam at them, thereby causing them to explode in the air.

Northrop Grumman unveiled the HELRAM concept in October 2004, saying that it "could be available within 18 months of a contract".

Its technology is based on that of the THEL system.

== See also ==
- Laser
- Directed energy weapons
- THEL
