= Supercritical angle fluorescence microscopy =

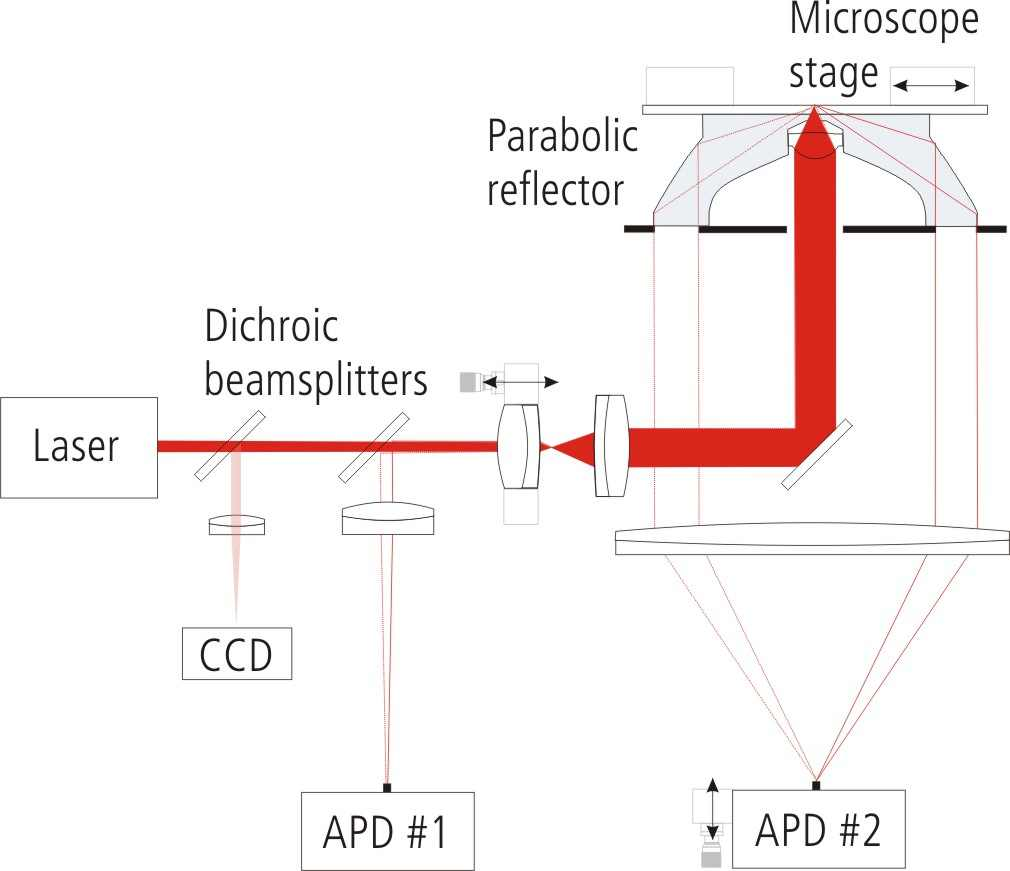
Typical SAF-setup

Supercritical angle fluorescence microscopy (SAF) is a technique to detect and characterize fluorescent species (proteins, biomolecules, pharmaceuticals, etc.) and their behaviour close or even adsorbed or linked at surfaces. The method is able to observe molecules in a distance of less than 100 to 0 nanometer from the surface even in presence of high concentrations of fluorescent species around. Using an aspheric lens for excitation of a sample with laser light, fluorescence emitted by the specimen is collected above the critical angle of total internal reflection selectively and directed by a parabolic optics onto a detector. The method was invented in 1998 in the laboratories of Stefan Seeger at University of Regensburg/Germany and later at University of Zurich/Switzerland.

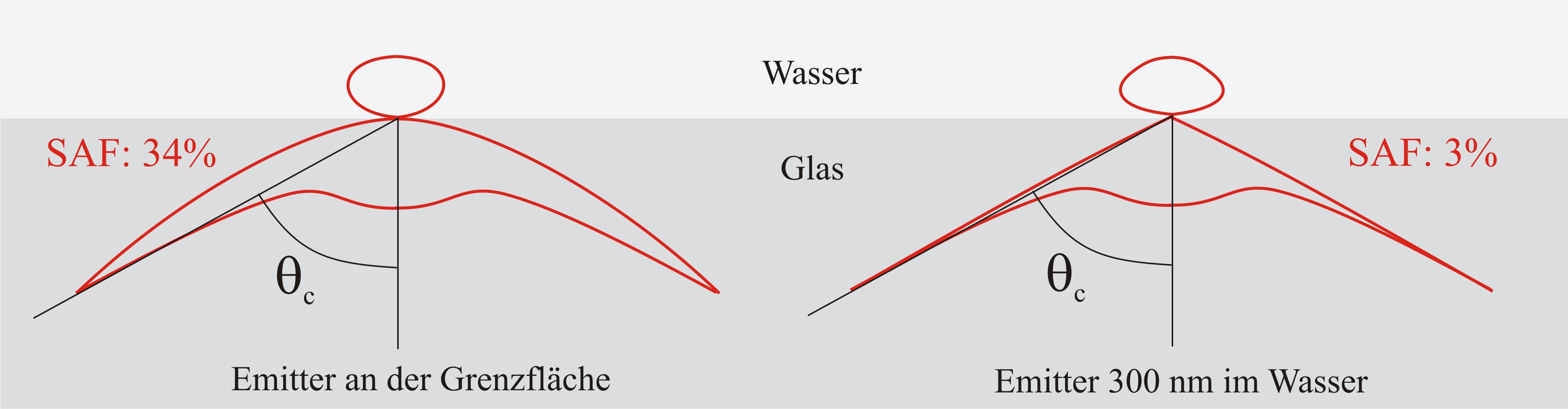
Polar plots of the direction of fluorescence (dipole) at the interface between water and glass

== SAF microscopy principle ==
The principle how SAF Microscopy works is as follows: A fluorescent specimen does not emit fluorescence isotropically when it comes close to a surface, but approximately 70% of the fluorescence emitted is directed into the solid phase. Here, the main part enters the solid body above the critical angle. When the emitter is located just 200 nm above the surface, fluorescent light entering the solid body above the critical angle is decreased dramatically. Hence, SAF Microscopy is ideally suited to discriminate between molecules and particles at or close to surfaces and all other specimen present in the bulk.

== Typical SAF-setup ==
The typical SAF setup consists of a laser line (typically 450-633 nm), which is reflected into the aspheric lens by a dichroic mirror. The lens focuses the laser beam in the sample, causing the particles to fluoresce. The fluorescent light then passes through a parabolic lens before reaching a detector, typically a photomultiplier tube or avalanche photodiode detector. It is also possible to arrange SAF elements as arrays, and image the output onto a CCD, allowing the detection of multiple analytes.
