= Open fiber control =

Communications protocol

In telecommunication, Open fiber control is a protocol to ensure that both ends of a fiber-optic cable are connected before laser signals are transmitted in order to protect people from eye damage. When a device is turned on, it sends out low powered light. If it does not receive light back, it assumes that the fiber is not connected. When it receives light, it assumes that both ends of the fiber are connected and it switches the laser to full power. If one of the devices stops receiving light, it will revert to the low power mode.
