= RP Photonics Encyclopedia =

Encyclopedia of laser technology and related areas

The RP Photonics Encyclopedia (formerly Encyclopedia of Laser Physics and Technology) is an encyclopedia of optics and optoelectronics, laser technology, optical fibers, nonlinear optics, optical communications, imaging science, optical metrology, spectroscopy and ultrashort pulse physics. It is available online as a free resource. An earlier version of the encyclopedia appeared as a two-volume book. As of June 2026, the online version of the encyclopedia contains 1138 articles.

Since 2012, the encyclopedia is closely interlinked with the RP Photonics Buyer's Guide, a large directory of photonics product suppliers which besides supplier listings provides buyer-oriented technical background information and selection criteria for around 800 product categories. For the majority of product categories, there is a one-to-one correspondence between an encyclopedia article and a buyer's guide page for that type of products.

Other resources linked with the RP Photonics Encyclopedia are a blog named The Photonics Spotlight, a glossary of photonics terms and acronyms, various tutorials and case studies, and a photonics quiz.

The author is Dr. Rüdiger Paschotta, founder and managing director of RP Photonics AG in Frauenfeld, Switzerland.
