= LULI2000 =

High-power laser system

LULI2000 is a high-power laser system dedicated to scientific research. It is located in LULI laboratory, at École Polytechnique in France. The main application of this type of laser is related to the very high energy fluxes obtained after focusing onto tiny focal spots, from micrometers to hundreds of micrometers in diameter. The interaction between these focused beams and small targets produces very hot plasmas, up to many hundred million degrees, high densities and high pressures. Depending on the laser and target parameters, these laser-generated plasmas may be compared to stars or planet interiors.

The main research topics addressed on LULI2000 concern laser inertial fusion and all its physical components, fundamental physics of hot and dense plasmas and its applications in astrophysics and geophysics, or the physics and processing of materials.

NANO2000, the nanosecond version of LULI2000, consists in two Nd:Glass laser chains, 200 mm in diameter, delivering each 1 kJ in nanosecond pulses at 1.05 μm wavelength. After frequency doubling or tripling, a large part of the energy may be converted to 0.53 μm or 0.35 μm. These beams are then focussed in the middle of a 2 m diameter vacuum chamber where they irradiate targets of different types. The interaction itself and the characteristics of the laser-generated hot plasmas are diagnosed by a whole set of dedicated diagnostics.

PICO2000, the adaptation of one NANO2000 laser chain in the picosecond regime, will deliver 200 J in 1 ps at 1.05 μm. LULI2000 will be the most energetic laser facility in Europe coupling nanosecond and picosecond pulses. The fast-igniter scheme for laser inertial fusion will be one of the main topics addressed on this facility, in coordination with future installations such as PETAL and HiPER.
