= Fourier domain mode locking =

Basic Setup of an FDML Laser

Fourier domain mode locking (FDML) is a laser modelocking technique that creates a continuous wave, wavelength-swept light output.

A Fourier domain mode locked laser consists of a ring cavity of length $L$ with tunable optical bandpass filter and gain element. For FDML operation, the filter tuning frequency $f$ needs to match the inverse cavity roundtrip time $1/\tau = c/(nL)$ or a ith harmonic thereof,

$$f_i=i\frac{c}{nL}$$,

with the group speed of light $c/n$ in the fiber cavity, where $c$ is the speed of light in vacuum and $n$ is the cavity's refractive index.

A basic FDML laser configuration – as shown in the figure – consists of:

- semiconductor optical amplifier (SOA) as gain medium
- fiber Fabry Perot tunable filter (FFP-TF) as bandpass filter
- polarization controller (PC) to optimize the polarization for the SOA
- delay fiber (DELAY) to meet the requirement that the roundtrip time is a multiple of the inverse filter tuning frequency
- fiber coupler (FC) to couple out a fraction of the light power
- isolator (ISO)

A main application for FDML lasers is optical coherence tomography.

The swept light of an FDML lasers can be viewed as being analogous to a strongly chirped mode-locked laser pulse. Hence, it was also studied how the swept light field of an FDML laser can be compressed to generate short pulses of 60 picoseconds duration. Furthermore, the work suggests that FDML lasers could overcome the limitations of conventional pulsed laser operation. Here, the energy of the light field is optically stored in the delay fiber, enabling high energy pulses to be produced directly with a low-power semiconductor laser. Shorter pulses in the femtosecond regime might be possible in the future.

Recently, the fast and spectrally broad wavelength sweeps of FDML lasers were used for stimulated Raman spectroscopy (SRS) and hyperspectral microscopy. In SRS, the energy difference between two lasers is used to excite a Raman scattering mode. In this new technique, called time-encoded (TICO) Raman, the fast sweeping rate of the FDML laser enables a fast coverage of a broad spectral range of Raman transitions.

== See also ==
- Mode-locking
