= Saturated absorption spectroscopy =

Measurement of atomic transition frequency

Saturated absorption spectroscopy measures the transition frequency of an atom or molecule between its ground state and an excited state, typically to a higher precision than standard spectroscopy. In saturated absorption spectroscopy, two counter-propagating, overlapped laser beams are sent through a sample of atomic gas. One of the beams stimulates photon emission in excited atoms or molecules when the laser's frequency matches the transition frequency. By changing the laser frequency until these extra photons appear, one can find the exact transition frequency. This method enables precise measurements at room temperature because it is insensitive to Doppler broadening. Absorption spectroscopy measures the Doppler-broadened transition, so the atoms must be cooled to millikelvin temperatures to achieve the same sensitivity as saturated absorption spectroscopy.

== Principle of saturated absorption spectroscopy ==
To overcome the problem of Doppler broadening without cooling down the sample to millikelvin temperatures, a classical pump–probe scheme is used. A laser with a relatively high intensity is sent through the atomic vapor, known as the pump beam. Another counter-propagating weak beam is also sent through the atoms at the same frequency, known as the probe beam. The absorption of the probe beam is recorded on a photodiode for various frequencies of the beams.

Although the two beams are at the same frequency, they address different atoms due to natural thermal motion. If the beams are red-detuned with respect to the atomic transition frequency, then the pump beam will be absorbed by atoms moving towards the beam source, while the probe beam will be absorbed by atoms moving away from that source at the same speed in the opposite direction. If the beams are blue-detuned, the opposite occurs.

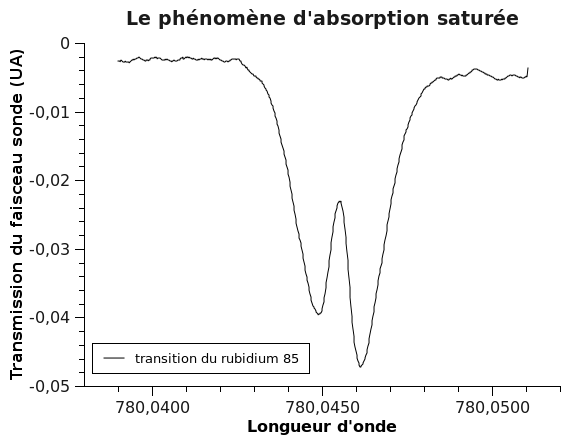
Typical transmission of the probe beam as recorded on the photodiode for natural rubidium as a function of the laser's wavelength

If, however, the laser is approximately on resonance, these two beams address the same atoms, those with velocity vectors nearly perpendicular to the direction of laser propagation. In the two-state approximation of an atomic transition, the strong pump beam will cause many of the atoms to be in the excited state; when the number of atoms in the ground state and the excited state are approximately equal, the transition is said to be saturated. When a photon from the probe beam passes through the atoms, there is a good chance that, if it encounters an atom, the atom will be in the excited state and will thus undergo stimulated emission, with the photon passing through the sample. Thus, as the laser frequency is swept across the resonance, a small dip in the absorption feature will be observed at each atomic transition (generally hyperfine resonances). The stronger the pump beam, the wider and deeper the dips in the Gaussian Doppler-broadened absorption feature become. Under perfect conditions, the width of the dip can approach the natural linewidth of the transition.

A consequence of this method of counter-propagating beams on a system with more than two states is the presence of crossover lines. When two transitions are within a single Doppler-broadened feature and share a common ground state, a crossover peak at a frequency exactly between the two transitions can occur. This is the result of moving atoms seeing the pump and probe beams resonant with two separate transitions. The pump beam can cause the ground state to be depopulated, saturating one transition, while the probe beam finds much fewer atoms in the ground state because of this saturation, and its absorption falls. These crossover peaks can be quite strong, often stronger than the main saturated absorption peaks.

== Doppler broadening of the absorption spectrum of an atom ==
According to the description of an atom interacting with the electromagnetic field, the absorption of light by the atom depends on the frequency of the incident photons. More precisely, the absorption is characterized by a Lorentzian of width Γ/2 (for reference, Γ ≈ 2π × 6 MHz for common rubidium D-line transitions). If we have a cell of atomic vapour at room temperature, then the distribution of velocity will follow a Maxwell–Boltzmann distribution

$$n(v)\,dv = N \sqrt{\frac{m}{2\pi k_B T}}e^{-\frac{mv^2}{2k_B T}}\,dv,$$

where $N$ is the number of atoms, $k_B$ is the Boltzmann constant, and $m$ is the mass of the atom. According to the Doppler effect formula in the case of non-relativistic speeds,

$$\omega_\text{lab} = \omega_0\left(1 \pm \frac{v}{c}\right),$$

where $\omega_0$ is the frequency of the atomic transition when the atom is at rest (the one which is being probed). The value of $v$ as a function of $\omega_0$ and $\omega_\text{lab}$ can be inserted in the distribution of velocities. The distribution of absorption as a function of the pulsation will therefore be proportional to a Gaussian with full width at half maximum

$$\Delta\omega_\text{lab} = \omega_0 \sqrt{\frac{8k_BT \ln 2 }{mc^2}}.$$

For a rubidium atom at room temperature,

$$\Delta\omega_\text{lab} \approx 500~\text{MHz} \approx 2\pi \cdot 80~\text{MHz} \gg \Gamma/2 \approx 2\pi \cdot 3~\text{MHz}.$$

Therefore, without any special trick in the experimental setup probing the maximum of absorption of an atomic vapour, the uncertainty of the measurement will be limited by the Doppler broadening and not by the fundamental width of the resonance.

== Experimental realization ==
As the pump and the probe beam must have a nearly identical frequency, the most convenient solution is for them to come from the same laser. The probe beam can be a reflection of the pump beam passed through a neutral density filter to reduce its intensity. To fine-tune the frequency of the laser, a diode laser with a piezoelectric transducer that controls the cavity wavelength can be used. Due to photodiode noise, the laser frequency can be swept across the transition and the photodiode reading averaged over many sweeps.

In real atoms, there are sometimes more than two relevant transitions within the sample's Doppler profile (e.g. in alkali atoms with hyperfine interactions). This will generate the apparition of other dips in the absorption feature due to these new resonances in addition to crossover resonances.
