= Margaret Murnane =

Irish physicist (born 1959)

Margaret M. Murnane
- Born: January 23, 1959; County Limerick, Ireland
- Education: University College Cork (B.S., 1981 M.S., 1983); University of California at Berkeley (Ph.D., 1989)
- Known for: Founder of the field of ultrafast x-ray science KMLabs Co-founder
- Spouse: Physicist Henry Kapteyn
- Scientific career
- Fields: Physics
- Workplaces: University of California, Berkeley (1989–1990); Washington State University (1990–1995); University of Michigan (1996–1999); University of Colorado Boulder (1999 – present)

Margaret Mary Murnane (born 23 January 1959) is an Irish physicist, who served as a distinguished professor of physics at the University of Colorado Boulder, having moved there in 1999, with past positions at the University of Michigan and Washington State University. She is the director of the STROBE NSF Science and Technology Center and a researcher in laser science and technology.

Her interests and research contributions span topics including atomic, molecular, and optical physics, nanoscience, laser technology, materials and chemical dynamics, plasma physics, and imaging science. Her work has earned her awards including the MacArthur Fellowship award in 2000, the Frederic Ives Medal/Quinn Prize in 2017, the highest award of The Optical Society, and the 2021 Benjamin Franklin Medal in Physics.

== Early life ==
Born and raised in County Limerick, Ireland, Murnane became interested in physics through her father who was a primary school teacher. She received her B.A. and M.S. from University College, Cork. She moved to the United States to study at the University of California, Berkeley, where she earned her PhD in 1989 under Roger Falcone. She is married to Henry Kapteyn. They work together and operate their own lab at JILA at the University of Colorado.

== Career ==
Murnane has co-authored more than 500 articles in peer reviewed journals, with her work receiving around 35000 citations. She is a founder of the field of ultrafast X-ray science, having made contributions to this area of research in every decade since the 1980s. She has developed her university-based laboratory effort in collaboration with Kapteyn.

In their lab, Murnane, Kapteyn, and their students make lasers whose beams flash like a strobe light – except that each flash is a trillion times faster. These lasers, like camera flashes, make it possible to record the motions of atoms in chemical reactions, and of atoms and electrons in materials systems. Some of her lasers can generate pulses of less than 10 femtoseconds.The very high peak power of these ultrashort laser pulses makes it possible to coherently upconvert light to much shorter wavelengths, in the extreme ultraviolet and soft X-ray region of the spectrum. This high harmonic generation process makes possible a tabletop-scale X-ray laser light source.

Murnane explored the use of femtosecond lasers for x-ray generation and has made substantive contributions to many aspects of this area of research, including the understanding of the high harmonic process, the laser technology required to use this process to implement practical tabletop light sources for applications, and in applying this new source to make fundamental discoveries in areas ranging from basic atomic and chemical dynamics to materials dynamics, to nanoimaging. She is also a founder of the area now known as experimental "Attosecond Science", having performed experiments that demonstrated the ability to manipulate electron dynamics with attosecond precision. She is the co-founder of the laser company KMLabs, Inc., for which Intel Capital is a co-investor.

== Honours ==
- 1998 Fellow of The Optical Society
- 2000 John D. and Catherine T. MacArthur Fellow
- 2001 Fellow of the American Physical Society
- 2003 Richtmyer Memorial Award Lecturer of the American Association of Physics Teachers
- 2003 Fellow of the American Association for the Advancement of Science
- 2004 Member of the National Academy of Sciences
- 2006 Fellow of the American Academy of Arts and Sciences
- 2007 Fellow of the Association for Women in Science
- 2010 Arthur L. Schawlow Prize in Laser Science
- 2010 R. W. Wood Prize, The Optical Society
- 2011 Boyle Medal
- 2012 Willis E. Lamb Award for Laser Science and Quantum Optics
- 2015 Honorary doctorate from Trinity College Dublin
- 2015 Member of the American Philosophical Society
- 2016 honorary doctorate from the Faculty of Science and Technology at Uppsala University, Sweden
- 2017 Frederic Ives Medal/Quinn Prize in optics from The Optical Society
- 2021 Benjamin Franklin Medal (Franklin Institute) in Physics (shared with Henry Kapteyn)
- 2022 Isaac Newton Medal, from Institute of Physics
- 2023 honorary doctorate from the University of Salamanca, Spain
- 2026 Optica Honorary Member

== Publications ==
- Popmintchev, T.; Chen, M. C.; Popmintchev, D.; Arpin, P.; Brown, S.; Ališauskas, S.; Andriukaitis, G.; Balčiūnas, T.; Mücke, O. D.; Pugzlys, A.; Baltuška, A.; Shim, B.; Schrauth, S. E.; Gaeta, A.; Hernández-García, C.; Plaja, L.; Becker, A.; Jaron-Becker, A.; Murnane, M. M.; Kapteyn, H. C. (2012). "Bright coherent ultrahigh harmonics in the keV x-ray regime from mid-infrared femtosecond lasers". Science. 336 (6086): 1287–1291. arXiv:2403.19535. doi:10.1126/science.1218497. PMID 22679077.
- Rundquist, A.; Durfee III, C. G.; Chang, Z.; Herne, C.; Backus, S.; Murnane, M. M.; Kapteyn, H. C. (1998). "Phase-matched generation of coherent soft X-rays". Science. 280 (5368): 1412–1415. arXiv:2403.19636. doi:10.1126/science.280.5368.1412. PMID 9624047.
- Chang, Z.; Rundquist, A.; Wang, H.; Murnane, M. M.; Kapteyn, H. C. (1997). "Generation of coherent soft X rays at 2.7 nm using high harmonics". Physical Review Letters. 79 (16): 2967–2970. doi:10.1103/PhysRevLett.79.2967.
