= Double ionization =

Rapid removal of two electrons from an atom

Double ionization is a process of formation of doubly charged ions when laser radiation or charged particles like electrons, positrons or heavy ions are exerted on neutral atoms or molecules. Double ionization is usually less probable than single-electron ionization. Two types of double ionization are distinguished: sequential and non-sequential.

== Sequential double ionization ==
Sequential double ionization is a process of formation of doubly charged ions consisting of two single-electron ionization events: the first electron is removed from a neutral atom/molecule (leaving a singly charged ion in the ground state or an excited state) followed by detachment of the second electron from the ion.

Examples of sequential double ionization
Sequential double ionization

Sequential double ionization via an ionic exited state

== Non-sequential double ionization ==
Non-sequential double ionization is a process whose mechanism differs (in any detail) from the sequential one. For example, both the electrons leave the system simultaneously (as in alkaline earth atoms, see below), the second electron's liberation is assisted by the first electron (as in noble gas atoms, see below), etc.

The phenomenon of non-sequential double ionization was experimentally discovered by Suran and Zapesochny for alkaline earth atoms as early as 1975. Despite extensive studies, the details of double ionization in alkaline earth atoms remain unknown. It is supposed that double ionization in this case is realized by transitions of both the electrons through the spectrum of autoionizing atomic states, located between the first and second ionization potentials.

Non-sequential double ionization in alkaline earth atoms

For noble gas atoms, non-sequential double ionization was first observed by L'Huillier. The interest to this phenomenon grew rapidly after it was rediscovered in infrared fields and for higher intensities. Multiple ionization has also been observed. The mechanism of non-sequential double ionization in noble gas atoms differs from the one in alkaline earth atoms. For noble gas atoms in infrared laser fields, following one-electron ionization, the liberated electron can recollide with the parent ion. This electron acts as an "atomic antenna", absorbing the energy from the laser field between ionization and recollision and depositing it into the parent ion. Inelastic scattering on the parent ion results in further collisional excitation and/or ionization. This mechanism is known as the three-step model of non-sequential double ionization, which is also closely related to the three step model of high harmonic generation.

Dynamics of double ionization within the three-step model strongly depends on the laser field intensity. The maximum energy (in atomic units) gained by the recolliding electron from the laser field is $\sim 3.2 U_p$, where $U_p=\frac{F^2}{4\omega^2}$ is the ponderomotive energy, $F$ is the laser field strength, and $\omega$ is the laser frequency. Even when $3.2 U_p$ is far below ionization potential $I_p$ experiments have observed correlated ionization. As opposed to the high-$U_p$ regime ($3.2 U_p > I_p$) in the low-$U_p$ regime ($3.2 U_p < I_p$) the assistance of the laser field during the recollision is vital.

Classical and quantum analysis of the low-$U_p$ regime demonstrates the following two ways of electron ejection after the recollision: First, the two electrons can be freed with little time delay compared to the quarter-cycle of the driving laser field. Second, the time delay between the ejection of the first and the second electron is of the order of the quarter-cycle of the driving field. In these two cases, the electrons appear in different quadrants of the correlated spectrum. If following the recollision, the electrons are ejected nearly simultaneously, their parallel momenta have equal signs, and both electrons are driven by the laser field in the same direction toward the detector. If after the recollision, the electrons are ejected with a substantial delay (quarter-cycle or more), they end up going in the opposite directions. These two types of dynamics produce distinctly different correlated spectra (compare experimental results with .

Non-sequential double ionization of noble gas atoms
The high-$U_p$ regime

The low-$U_p$ regime

== See also ==
- List of laser articles
- Nonlinear optics
- Photoionization
- Ionization
- High harmonic generation
- Above threshold ionization
