= Jens Biegert =

German optical physicist and professor

- Education: University of Würzburg; Technical University of Munich
- Known for: Attosecond physics; Laser science; Atomic physics; Quantum dynamics
- Scientific career
- Fields: Attosecond physics
- Workplaces: ICFO – The Institute of Photonic Sciences; University of New Mexico; Fritz Haber Institute of the Max Planck Society

Jens Biegert is a German physicist specializing in attosecond physics and ultrafast optics. He is an ICREA Research Professor at ICFO – The Institute of Photonic Sciences, a research professor at the University of New Mexico, a guest professor at the Fritz Haber Institute of the Max Planck Society, and director of the Max Planck New York Center for Non-Equilibrium Quantum Phenomena at ICFO.

Biegert is a Fellow of the Alexander von Humboldt Foundation, the American Physical Society, the German Academic Scholarship Foundation (Studienstiftung des deutschen Volkes), and Optica. He has served on the Board of Directors of Optica, as Executive Director of Laserlab-Europe, and on the Board of Chairs of the Analytical Research Infrastructures of Europe.

== Education ==
Biegert studied physics at the University of Würzburg, the University of New Mexico, and Technical University of Munich. Supported by the dissertation fellowship of the Studienstiftung des deutschen Volkes, he earned his PhD with distinction from the Technical University of Munich in 2001 under the joint supervision of Jean-Claude Diels and Alfred Laubereau. His PhD thesis, titled “Multi-photon coherent excitation of Sodium”, received the Allen Prize of the Optical Society (now Optica).

Following his doctoral studies, Biegert joined ETH Zürich, where he led a research group for his Habilitation. In 2007, he was appointed ICREA Research Professor of Attoscience and Ultrafast Optics at ICFO, and he received the Accreditation as University Chair in 2009.

== Research and career ==
Biegert's research focuses on quantum many-body dynamics on attosecond time scales and Ångström spatial scales. His research group develops high-power laser systems operating from the mid-infrared to the soft X-ray spectral regions to observe electronic, photonic, and atomic interactions in real time.

His work in attosecond science includes the development of ultrafast mid-infrared lasers and frequency combs designed to extend strong-field physics to longer wavelengths and higher photon energies. This research has generated attosecond soft X-ray pulses extending into the water window, as well as attosecond electron pulses. In 2025, his group measured a 19.2-attosecond optical pulse, shorter than the atomic unit of time.

Biegert has also extended attosecond spectroscopy to condensed matter physics and quantum materials. His team has utilized attosecond core-level spectroscopy to track real-time energy flow among electrons, phonons, and crystal lattices. Additionally, they have applied high-harmonic spectroscopy to detect quantum phase transitions in superconductors and to probe the quantum-optical nature of high-harmonic generation.

His research has further demonstrated the optical control of valley topology, enabling valley polarization in bulk materials without relying on monolayer structures.

== Awards and recognition ==
Awards and prizes

C.E.K. Mees Medal, Optica (2026)

Bessel Prize, Alexander von Humboldt Foundation (2019)

Allen Prize, Optica (2004)

Fellowships and academy memberships

Member of the Academia Europaea (2026)

Fellow of the American Physical Society (2019)

Fellow of Optica (2016)

Marie Skłodowska Curie Fellowship, European Commission (2001)

Dissertation Fellowship, Studienstiftung des deutschen Volkes (1999)

Exchange Fellowship, Deutscher Akademischer Austauschdienst (1995)

== Selected publications ==
- Amini, Kasra; Sclafani, Michele; Steinle, Tobias; Le, Anh-Thu; Sanchez, Aurelien; Müller, Carolin; Steinmetzer, Johannes; Yue, Lun; Martínez Saavedra, José Ramón; Hemmer, Michaël; Lewenstein, Maciej; Moshammer, Robert; Pfeifer, Thomas; Pullen, Michael G.; Ullrich, Joachim; Wolter, Benjamin; Moszynski, Robert; García de Abajo, F. Javier; Lin, C. D.; Gräfe, Stefanie; Biegert, Jens (2019). "Imaging the Renner–Teller effect using laser-induced electron diffraction". Proceedings of the National Academy of Sciences. 116 (17): 201817465. arXiv:1805.06793. Bibcode:2019PNAS..116.8173A. doi:10.1073/pnas.1817465116.
- Summers, Adam; Severino, Stefano; Reduzzi, Maurizio; Sidiropoulos, Themistoklis; Rivas, Daniel; Di Palo, Nicola; Sun, Hung-Wei; Chien, Ying-Hao; León, Iker; Buades, Bárbara; Cousin, Seth; Teichmann, Stephan; Mey, Tobias; Mann, Klaus; Keitel, Barbara; Plönjes, Elke; Efetov, Dmitri; Schwoerer, Heinrich; Biegert, Jens (2023). "Realizing Attosecond Core-Level X-ray Spectroscopy for the Investigation of Condensed Matter Systems". Ultrafast Science. 3: 0004. Bibcode:2023UltSc...3...04S. doi:10.34133/ultrafastscience.0004. hdl:2117/386469.
