= Kenneth J. Schafer =

American physicist

- Education: University of Arizona
- Known for: Strong Field Physics; Ultra-short light pulse generation
- Scientific career
- Fields: Theoretical physics Atomic Molecular and Optical Physics
- Workplaces: Louisiana State University
- Thesis: Ion-surface scattering in the time-dependent mean-field approximation (1989)

Kenneth J. Schafer is an American physicist who is the Ball Family Distinguished Professor and the Boyd Professor at the Department of Physics and Astronomy of the Louisiana State University.

== Career ==
Kenneth Schafer got his PhD in physics from the University of Arizona in 1989, and, after a few years of postdoctoral research with Kenneth Kulander in the Lawrence Livermore National Laboratory and in Kent Wilson Group at the University of California, San Diego, he joined the Physics faculty at Louisiana State University at the rank of tenure-tracked assistant professor in 1995.

== Research ==
At Louisiana State University, Schafer started his tenure-track position, continuing his postdoctoral research with Kent Wilson in heavy classical numerical simulations of the Coulomb explosion of the small atomic clusters. Purchasing for the calculations a SGI O2 machine, the research on the cold-hot nuclear fusion in small deuterium cluster droplets heated by the ultra-strong laser fields was later observed by Ditmire in the Livermore National Laboratory; The method of observation was a realistic and working, microscopic and voltage-scaled paraphrase of the pioneering hypothetical chemical method of inducing fusion in palladium by Martin Fleischmann and Stanley Pons. They used the deuterium pre-compression by a palladium fcc lattice sponge, heavy water-like molecular trapping and cooling, and the giant voltage from the laser field to induce cluster "electrolysis".

His theoretical contributions in the field of light–matter interactions, high harmonic generation and ultra short light pulse generation by highly nonlinear excitations and pulse shape propagation tailoring in solids and the Fourier phase matching contributed to the experiments that were part of the Nobel Prize in Physics to his scientific collaborator Anne L'Huillier in 2023.

=== Selected publications ===
- L’Huillier, A.; Schafer, K. J.; and Kulander, K. C. (1991). "Theoretical aspects of intense field harmonic generation". . Phys. B: At. Mol. Opt. Phys. 24: 3315. doi:10.1088/0953-4075/24/15/004.
- Krause, J. L.; Schafer, K. J..; and Kulander, K. C. (1992). "High-order harmonic generation from atoms and ions in the high intensity regime". Phys. Rev. Lett. 68: 3535.
- Schafer, K. J.; Yang, B.; DiMauro, L.F.; and Kulander, K.C. (1993). "Above threshold ionization beyond the high harmonic cutoff". Phys. Rev. Lett. 70: 1599.
- Schafer, K. J.; and Kulander, K. C. (1997). "High Harmonic Generation from Ultrafast Pump Lasers". Phys. Rev. Lett. 78: 638.
- Rose-Petruck, C.; Schafer, K.J.; Wilson, K.R.; and Barty, C.P.J. (1997). "Ultrafast electron dynamics and inner-shell ionization in laser driven clusters". Phys. Rev. A. 55: 1182.
