= Resonant high harmonic generation from laser ablated plasma plumes =

High Harmonic Generation (HHG) is a non-perturbative and extremely nonlinear optical process taking place when a highly intense ultrashort laser pulse undergoes an interaction with a nonlinear media. A typical high order harmonic spectra contains frequency combs separated by twice the laser frequency. HHG is an excellent table top source of highly coherent extreme ultraviolet and soft X-ray laser pulses.

== Three-step model ==
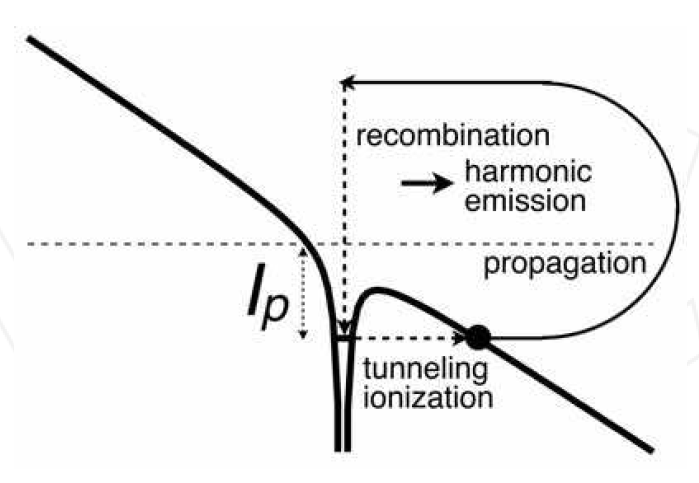
Three step model of high-harmonic generation

HHG process can be very easily as well as intuitively explained by a simple three-step model originally proposed by Paul Corkum in 1993.

Step 1: The outermost electron undergoes tunnel ionization upon interaction with the ultrashort laser pulse.

Step 2: This tunnel ionized electron undergoes acceleration under the effect of laser pulse electric field.

Step 3: When the electric field the ultrashort laser pulse undergoes the reversal of direction, this accelerated electron returns and recombines radiatively with the parent ion emitting high harmonics.

In Corkum's three-step model, the electron is treated as a free particle having no effect of the coulomb potential.

Since the tunnel ionization and recombination process is happening twice in every cycle of the excitation laser pulse, the HHG process has the capability to generate the attosecond bursts of radiation by using femtosecond laser pulses as a source of excitation.

== HHG from laser plasma ==
HHG can happen both in gases as well as in laser ablated plasma plumes. In gas high harmonics, a gas jet usually acts as the nonlinear media and the femtosecond laser pulse interacts with the gas to emit high harmonics. Hence, only one laser pulse is required in gas harmonics. However to generate high harmonics from plasma plumes, we require another laser pulse focused onto the surface of a solid target to create a plume of laser ablated plasma. This plasma plume acts as a nonlinear medium for the nonlinear interaction. Typically, a long picosecond laser pulse is used for the purpose of plasma creation.

== Resonant HHG ==
In some plasma plumes, it was observed that the intensity of a certain harmonic order was exceptionally high as compared to its neighboring harmonics. For example, by using 800 nm femtosecond laser pulses, it was observed that with tin plasma, the intensity of 17th harmonic was an order of magnitude higher as compared to the intensity of its neighboring harmonics.

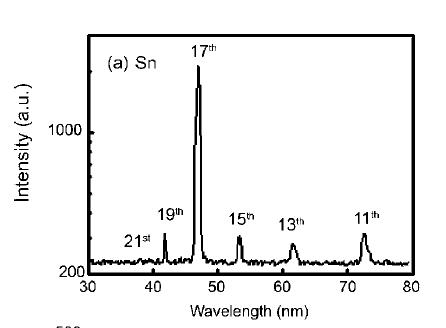
HHG spectra from tin ablation irradiated by a femtosecond laser pulse.

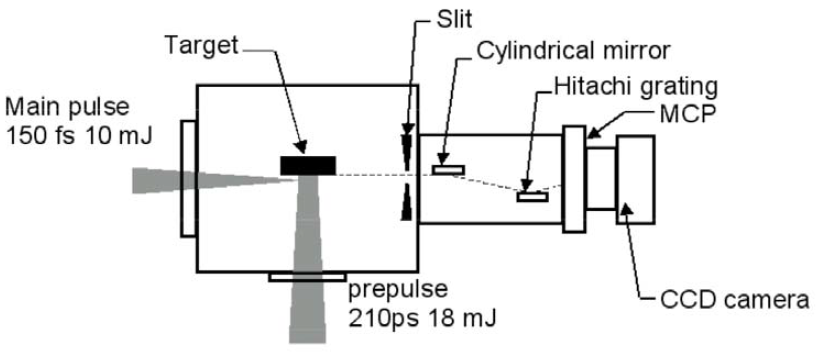
Schematic of experimental setup for HHG measurement from the laser ablation plume pumped by femtosecond laser pulse.

Similarly, it was seen that the intensity of 13th harmonic in indium plasma was much higher as compared to its neighboring harmonics. This was quite surprising because this kind of effect was never seen in gas harmonics. Upon careful investigations, it was pointed out by the researchers that this harmonic enhancement happens when the energy of a particular harmonic order matches with a strong transition present in the plasma. For example, it was observed that in tin, there exists a very strong transition 4d^{10} 5s^{2} 5p ^{2}P_{3/2} → 4d^{9} 5s^{2} 5p^{2} (^{1}D) ^{2}D_{5/2} at 26.27 eV and this transition has a high oscillator strength (gf value) of 1.52. The energy of this transition corresponds to 17th harmonic with 800 nm excitation wavelength. Similarly, in Indium, there exists a strong transition 4d^{10}5s^{2} → 4d^{9} 5s^{2} 5p at 19.92 eV with a high gf value of 1.11. The energy of this transition corresponds to 13th harmonic with 800 nm excitation wavelength. This enhancement in a particular harmonic order is most commonly known as Resonant High Harmonic Generation (RH). Apart from tin and Indium, RH has been observed in many other plasmas such as chromium, manganese, antimony etc. Presence of such resonances makes plasma harmonics very different from gas harmonics. The enhanced harmonic efficiency of a given harmonic order can be useful for the development of narrowband tabletop XUV light sources. These types of sources can be very helpful in various types of spectroscopy techniques.

== Four-step model ==
To explain this enhancement in a given harmonic order, the former three-step model was modified and a new four-step model was introduced. This model takes into account the role of autoionization states present in the continuum. The first two steps remain the same i.e. the tunnel ionization and the acceleration of this tunnel ionized electron in the continuum. However, in the third step, this tunnel ionization electron gets trapped into the autoionizing state present in the continuum. This autoionizing state usually has a longer lifetime. Then in the fourth step, this trapped electron recombines radiatively with the parent ion (ground state) emitting resonantly enhanced high harmonic.

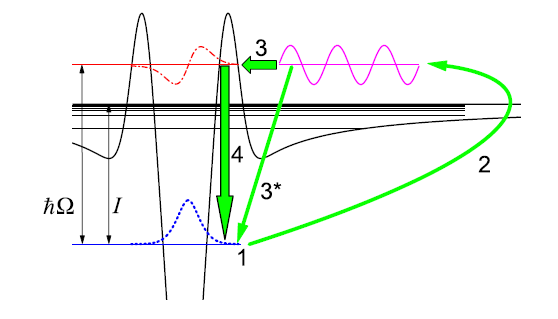
Schematic diagram of four-step model to explain the resonant harmonic generation
