= CEA Paris-Saclay =

French government energy research site

- CEA Paris-Saclay
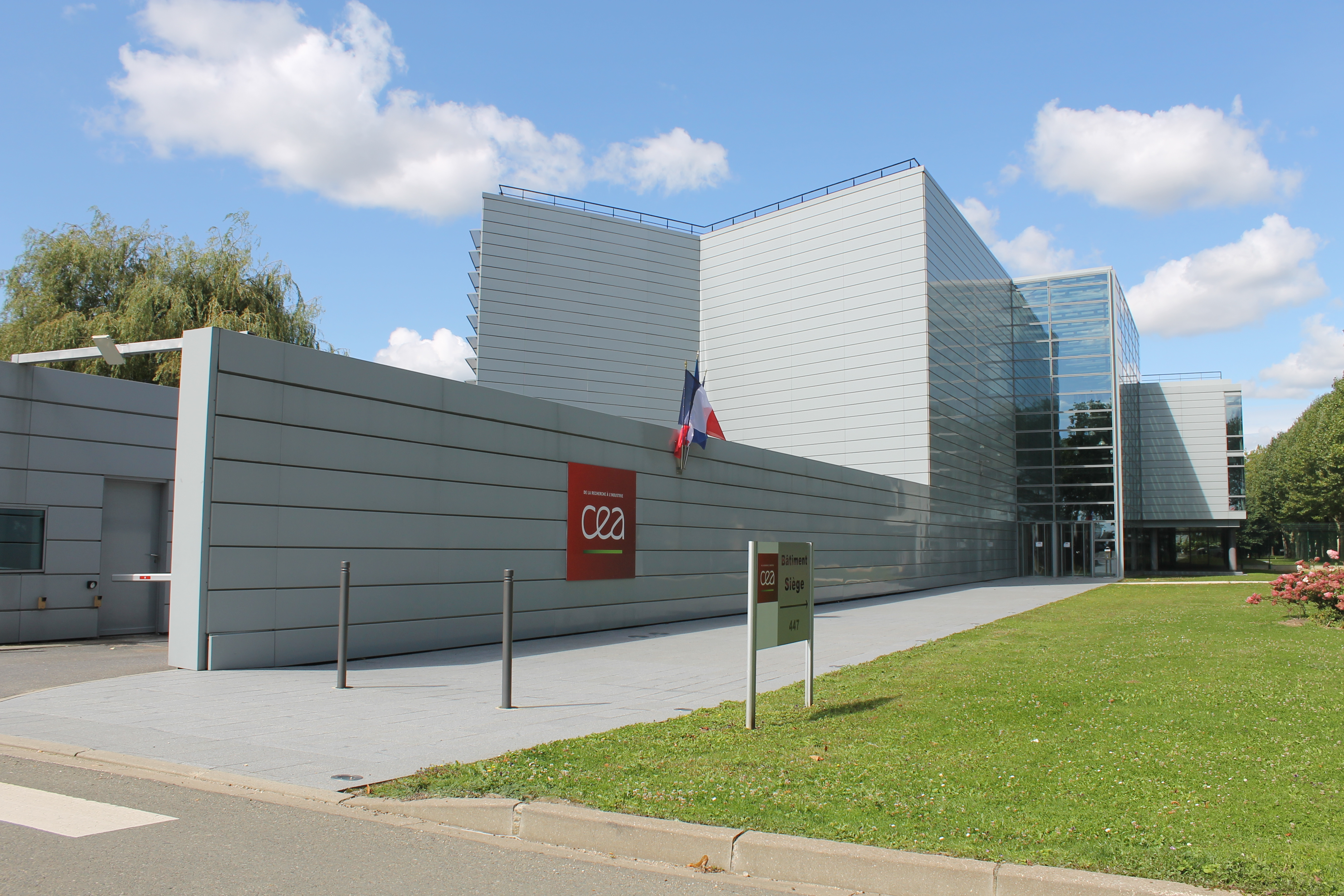
- East entrance of Saclay site of CEA Paris-Saclay center
- Formation: March 1, 1946; 80 years ago
- Location: France
- Board of directors: Hervé Barbelin (2024–present)
- Parent organization: French Alternative Energies and Atomic Energy Commission (CEA)
- Website: www.cea.fr/paris-saclay
- Formerly called: CEA Saclay center (+ separate sites)

The CEA Paris-Saclay center is one of nine centers belonging to the French Alternative Energies and Atomic Energy Commission (CEA). Following a reorganization in 2017, the center consists of multiple sites, including the CEA Saclay site (formerly a "center"), the Fontenay-aux-Roses site and the sites of Paris, Évry, Orsay and Caen.

Historically, as the main Saclay site was the heart of French nuclear research it was called the Saclay Center for Nuclear Studies (CEN Saclay) prior to the shift towards other fields of research and innovation besides nuclear.

The center has close ties with Paris-Saclay University, being located on the Saclay plateau and active in the Paris-Saclay project for innovation.

== Organization ==
5 of the 6 sites of CEA Paris-Saclay, in the Île-de-France region of France

Since February 2017, various sites were grouped together to the CEA Paris-Saclay center, including

- Saclay site (formerly a "center")
- Fontenay-aux-Roses site
- Paris site
- Évry site (Genoscope)
- Orsay site (Service Hospitalier Frédéric Joliot, SHFJ)
- Caen site (GANIL and CIMAP)

== History ==
On 10 October 1945, Charles de Gaulle launched the CEA. In 1946, the Fontenay-aux-Roses site was realized, followed by the Saclay site 6 years later in 1952. The Saclay site, located 20 km south of Paris on the Saclay plateau, is much bigger and was chosen in part to be close to Université Paris-Sud (which today is part of Paris-Saclay University).

The Saclay site was designed by the architect Auguste Perret.

== Research ==
The complex employs more than 7,500 scientists. Although CEA Saclay was initially focused on nuclear research, multiple domains of research are carried out there since a few decades back. These include:

- Low-carbon energies
- Climate and environment
- Matter and universe
- Health and life sciences
- Technology for industry

=== Reactors ===
The Saclay site has been home to multiple nuclear research reactors, including the Osiris, Isis and Orphée reactors.

The Osiris and Isis reactors (operated between 1965 and 2019) inspired the design of Iraq's Osirak facility. Multiple bacterial species were discovered to thrive in those reactor cores during operation, and may have fed off hydrogen from radiolysis.

== Notable subsidiaries ==
- National Institute for Nuclear Science and Technology (INSTN), which is dedicated to the academic and professional training in the field of atomic energy.
- Saclay Institute of Matter and Radiation (IRAMIS), which houses the Lasers, Interactions and Dynamics Laboratory (LIDyL) joint research unit where both Anne L'Huillier and Pierre Agostini attained breakthroughs in attosecond lasers, leading to their Nobel prize share in 2023.
- NeuroSpin is a neuroimaging research center with some of the most powerful MRI machines in the world

== Director of the site ==
- Hervé Barbelin (2024–present)
- Christian Bailly (2021–2024)
- Michel Bédoucha (2016–2021)
- Jacques Vayron (2012–2016)
- Yves Caristan (2005–2012)
- Jean-Pierre Pervès (2000–2005)
- Eliane Loquet (1993–2000)
- Jean Bazin (1990–1993)
- Paul Delpeyroux (–1990)
- ...
- Jean Debiesse (1954–1970)
- Jules Guéron (1951)

== People ==
- Jules Guéron, first director of the CEA's nuclear research center
- Jean-Baptiste Waldner, alumnus
- Étienne Klein, physicist, philosopher of science, author, and radio host
- Anne L'Huillier, ultra-fast laser physics, 2023 Nobel laureate in physics
- Pierre Agostini, pioneer of strong-field laser physics, 2023 Nobel laureate in physics
- Valérie Masson-Delmotte, climate scientist, co-chair of Working Group 1 of the IPCC
