= Attosecond physics =

Study of physics on quintillionth-second timescales

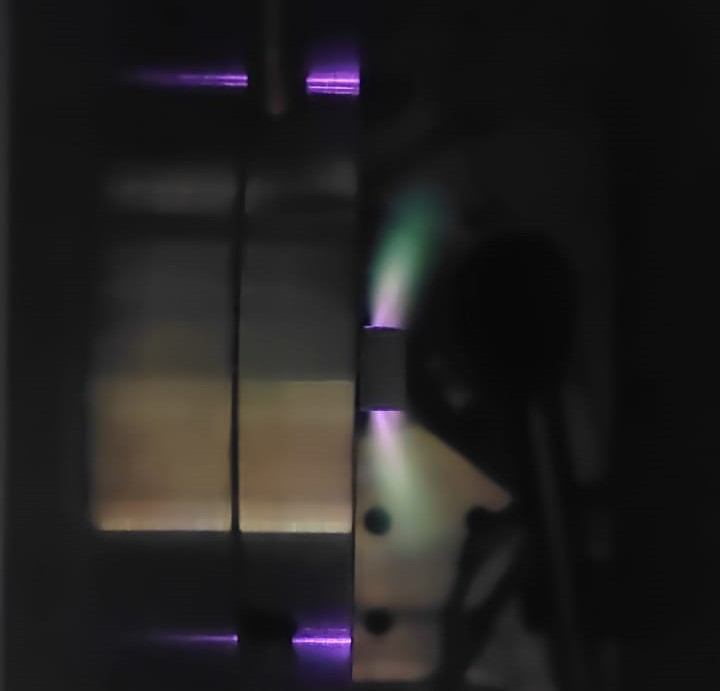
High harmonic generation in krypton. This technology is one of the most used techniques to generate attosecond bursts of light.

Attosecond physics, also known as attophysics, or more generally attosecond science, is a branch of physics that deals with light–matter interaction phenomena wherein attosecond (10^{−18} s) photon pulses are used to investigate dynamical processes in matter with unprecedented temporal resolution.

The main research topics in this field are:

1. Atomic physics: investigation of electron correlation effects, photo-emission delay and ionization tunneling.
2. Molecular physics and molecular chemistry: role of electronic motion in molecular excited states (e.g. charge-transfer processes), light-induced photo-fragmentation, and light-induced electron transfer processes.
3. Solid-state physics: investigation of exciton dynamics in advanced 2D materials, petahertz charge carrier motion in solids, spin dynamics in ferromagnetic materials.

One of the primary goals of attosecond science is to provide advanced insights into the quantum dynamics of electrons in atoms, molecules and solids with the long-term challenge of achieving real-time control of the electron motion in matter.

The advent of broadband solid-state titanium-doped sapphire based (Ti:Sa) lasers (1986), chirped pulse amplification (CPA) (1988), spectral broadening of high-energy pulses (e.g. gas-filled hollow-core fiber via self-phase modulation) (1996), mirror-dispersion-controlled technology (chirped mirrors) (1994), and carrier envelop offset stabilization (2000) had enabled the creation of isolated-attosecond light pulses (generated by the non-linear process of high harmonic generation in a noble gas) (2004, 2006), which have given birth to the field of attosecond science.

The current world record for the shortest light-pulse generated by human technology is 43 as.

In 2022, Anne L'Huillier, Paul Corkum, Ferenc Krausz were awarded with the Wolf Prize in physics for their pioneering contributions to ultrafast laser science and attosecond physics. This was followed by the 2023 Nobel Prize in Physics, where L'Huillier, Krausz and Pierre Agostini were rewarded "for experimental methods that generate attosecond pulses of light for the study of electron dynamics in matter."

== Introduction ==
"Electron motion" in a hydrogen atom. The period of this states superposition (1s-2p) is around 400 as.

=== Motivation ===
For simplicity, consider a quantum particle in superposition between ground-level, of energy $\epsilon_0$, and the first excited level, of energy $\epsilon_1$:

$$|\Psi\rangle=c_g|\psi_g\rangle+c_e|\psi_e\rangle$$

with $c_e$ and $c_g$ chosen as the square roots of the quantum probability of observing the particle in the corresponding state.

$$|\psi_g(t)\rangle= |0\rangle e^{-\frac{i\epsilon_0}{\hbar} t} \qquad  |\psi_e(t)\rangle =|1\rangle e^{-\frac{i\epsilon_1}{\hbar}t}$$

are the time-dependent ground $|0\rangle$ and excited state $|1\rangle$ respectively, with $\hbar$ being the reduced Planck constant.

The expectation value of a generic quantum-mechanical Hermitian operator, $\hat{P}$, can be written as $P(t)=\langle\Psi|\hat{P}|\Psi\rangle$, as a result the time-evolution function of this observable is:

$$P(t)=|c_g|^2\langle0|\hat{P}|0\rangle+|c_e|^2\langle1|\hat{P}|1\rangle+2c_ec_g\langle0|\hat{P}|1\rangle\cos\left(\frac{\epsilon_1-\epsilon_0}{\hbar}t \right)$$

While the first two terms do not depend on time, the third does instead. This creates a dynamic for the observable $P(t)$ with a characteristic time, $T_c$, given by $T_c=\frac{2\pi \hbar}{\epsilon_1-\epsilon_0}$.

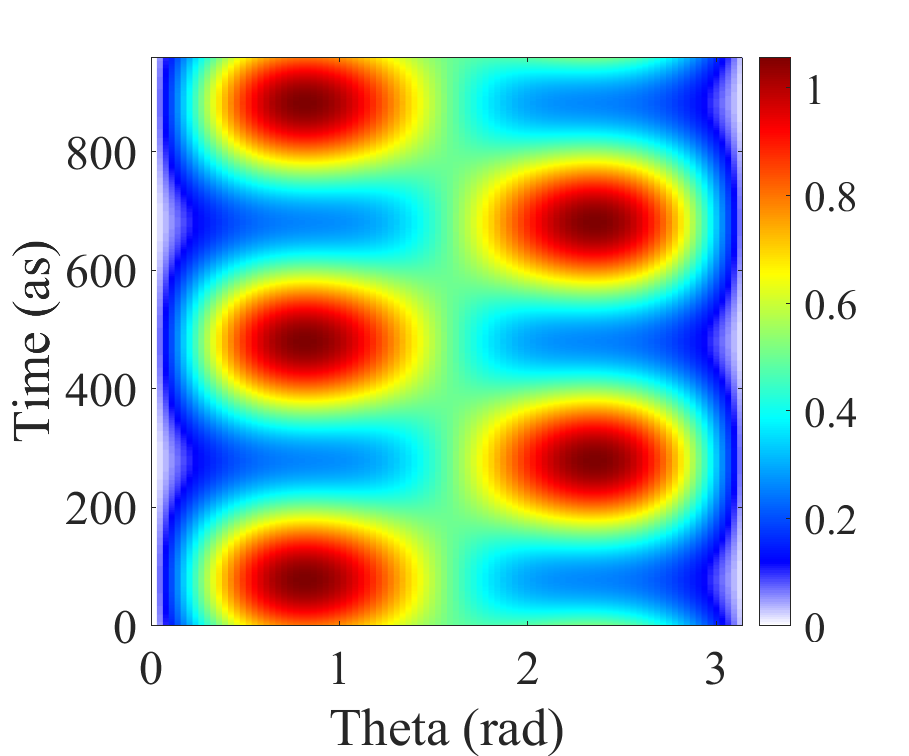
Evolution of the angular probability density of the superposition between 1s and 2p state in hydrogen atoms. The color bar indicates the angular density (orientation of the wavepacket) as a function of the polar angle from 0 to π (x-axis), at which one can find the particle, and time (y-axis).

As a consequence, for energy levels in the range of $\epsilon_1-\epsilon_0 \approx$ 10 eV, which is the typical energy range for electrons in matter, the characteristic time of the dynamics of any associated physical observable is approximately 400 as. To measure the temporal evolution of observables described by $P(t)$, one must utilize a controlled process that can interact with that dynamic within an even shorter time-span. Therefore, since $P(t)$ in practice describes the behavior of electrons within matter and because photons interact with electrons, attosecond light pulses are used to reveal the physics of ultra-fast phenomena within the few-femtosecond and attosecond time-domains usually involving the movement of electrons at a molecular scale.

=== Attosecond pulse generation ===
When generating a traveling pulse of light with an ultrashort time duration, two key elements are considered: the bandwidth and the central wavelength of the electromagnetic waves which compose said pulse as indicated via Fourier analysis. The shortest possible pulse duration is how long a single electromagnetic oscillation takes to occur for a given central wavelength $\lambda$ (i.e an optical cycle limitation). Since light by definition always travels through space at $c$–we can derive a formula for minimum pulse duration as follows:

$t_{pulse}=\frac{\lambda}{c}$

where $t_{pulse}$ is the shortest possible time-span a pulse of light can have given a central wavelength $\lambda$.

Using this formula for relatively low-energy near-infrared light ($\lambda=$800 nm) gives a minimum pulse duration of 2.67 fs, whereas high-energy extreme ultraviolet light ($\lambda=$30 nm) gives a minimum pulse duration of approximately 100 as. Since the spectral bandwidth corresponds to an electromagnetic frequency range, a more available spectral bandwidth means a potentially shorter pulse duration as this means that there are more high-energy/short-wavelength photons present. Thus, in order to obtain reliable attosecond-scale measurements, broadband XUV-SXR (extreme ultravilet to soft-X-ray) sources are required. Free-electron lasers (FEL) and high harmonic generation (HHG) setups are the most common sources for such light.

=== Physical observables and experiments ===
Once one obtains an attosecond light source, they must redirect the pulse towards a sample of interest to measure its quantum electrodynamics. The most suitable experimental observables for analyzing these electron dynamics in matter are:

- Angular asymmetry in the velocity distribution of molecular photo-fragment.
- Quantum yield of molecular photo-fragments.
- XUV-SXR spectrum transient absorption.
- XUV-SXR spectrum transient reflectivity.
- Photo-electron kinetic energy distribution.
- Attosecond electron microscopy

Pump-probe techniques are used to image ultra-fast processes occurring in matter.

Generally speaking, a pump-probe scheme is used to "image" through one of the aforementioned observables and document the ultra-fast dynamics occurring in the material of interest.

==== Few-femtosecond IR-XUV/SXR attosecond pulse pump-probe experiments ====
For example, in a typical pump-probe experimental apparatus, an attosecond (XUV-SXR) pulse and an intense ($10^{11}-10^{14}$ W/cm^{2}) low-frequency infrared pulse with a time duration of a few to tens femtoseconds are colinearly focused on the studied sample and by varying the delay of the attosecond pulse, which could be a pump and/or probe depending on the experiment, with respect to the IR pulse–which is again, a probe and/or pump–the desired physical observable is recorded. The subsequent challenge is to interpret the collected data and retrieve fundamental information on the hidden dynamics and quantum processes occurring in the sample. This can be achieved with advanced theoretical tools and numerical calculations. Several kinds of dynamics can be explored in matter at a molecular scale by exploiting this experimental scheme; typically light-induced dynamics and out-of-equilibrium excited states within attosecond time-resolution.

== Quantum mechanical foundations ==
Attosecond physics typically deals with non-relativistic bounded particles and employs electromagnetic fields with a moderately high intensity ($10^{11}-10^{14}$ W/cm^{2}).

This fact allows to set up a discussion in a non-relativistic and semi-classical quantum mechanics environment for light–matter interaction.

=== Atoms ===
==== Resolution of time dependent Schrödinger equation in an electromagnetic field ====
The time evolution of a single electronic wave function in an atom, $|\psi(t)\rangle$ is described by the Schrödinger equation (in atomic units):

$$\hat{H}|\psi(t)\rangle=i\hbar \dfrac{\partial}{\partial t}|\psi(t)\rangle \quad (1.0)$$

where the light–matter interaction Hamiltonian, $\hat{H}$, can be expressed in the length gauge, within the dipole approximation, as:

$$\hat{H}=\frac{1}{2}\hat{\textbf{p}}^2+V_{C}+ \hat{\textbf{r}}\cdot\textbf{E}(t)$$

where $V_C$ is the Coulomb potential of the atomic species considered; $\hat{\textbf{p}}, \hat{\textbf{r}}$ are the momentum and position operator, respectively; and $\textbf{E}(t)$ is the total electric field evaluated in the neighbor of the atom.

The formal solution of the Schrödinger equation is given by the propagator formalism:

$$|\psi(t)\rangle=e^{-i\int_{t_0}^{t}\hat{H}dt'}|\psi (t_0)\rangle \qquad(1.1)$$

where $|\psi (t_0)\rangle$, is the electron wave function at time $t=t_0$.

This exact solution cannot be used for almost any practical purpose.

However, it can be proved, using Dyson's equations that the previous solution can also be written as:

$$|\psi(t)\rangle=-i\int_{t_0}^{t}dt'\Big[ e^{-i\int_{t'}^{t}\hat{H}(t'')dt''}\hat{H}_I(t')e^{-i\int_{t_0}^{t'}\hat{H}_0(t'')dt''}|\psi(t_0)\rangle \Big]+e^{-i\int_{t_0}^{t}\hat{H}_0(t'')dt''}|\psi(t_0)\rangle \qquad(1.2)$$

where,

$$\hat{H}_0=\frac{1}{2}\hat{\textbf{p}}^2+V_{C}$$

is the bounded Hamiltonian and

$$\hat{H}_I=\hat{\textbf{r}}\cdot\textbf{E}(t)$$

is the interaction Hamiltonian.

The formal solution of Eq. $(1.0)$, which previously was simply written as Eq. $(1.1)$, can now be regarded in Eq. $(1.2)$ as a superposition of different quantum paths (or quantum trajectory), each one of them with a peculiar interaction time $t'$ with the electric field.

In other words, each quantum path is characterized by three steps:

1. An initial evolution without the electromagnetic field. This is described by the left-hand side $\hat{H}_0$ term in the integral.
2. Then, a "kick" from the electromagnetic field, $\hat{H}_I(t')$ that "excite" the electron. This event occurs at an arbitrary time that uni-vocally characterizes the quantum path $t'$.
3. A final evolution driven by both the field and the Coulomb potential, given by $\hat{H}$.

In parallel, you also have a quantum path that do not perceive the field at all, this trajectory is indicated by the right-hand side term in Eq. $(1.2)$.

This process is entirely time-reversible, i.e. can also occur in the opposite order.

Equation $(1.2)$ is not straightforward to handle. However, physicists use it as the starting point for numerical calculation, more advanced discussion or several approximations.

For strong-field interaction problems, where ionization may occur, one can imagine to project Eq. $(1.2)$ in a certain continuum state (unbounded state or free state) $|\textbf{p}\rangle$, of momentum $\textbf{p}$, so that:

$$c_{\textbf{p}}(t)=\langle\textbf{p}|\psi(t)\rangle=-i\int_{t_0}^{t}dt'\langle \textbf{p}|e^{-i\int_{t'}^{t}\hat{H}(t'')dt''}\hat{H}_I(t')e^{-i\int_{t_0}^{t'}\hat{H}_0(t'')dt''}|{\psi(t_0)}\rangle
+\langle \textbf{p} |e^{-i\int_{t_0}^{t}\hat{H}_0(t'')dt''}|\psi(t_0)\rangle \quad (1.3)$$

where $|c_{\textbf{p}}(t)|^2$ is the probability amplitude to find at a certain time $t$, the electron in the continuum states $|\textbf{p}\rangle$.

If this probability amplitude is greater than zero, the electron is photoionized.

For the majority of application, the second term in $(1.3)$ is not considered, and only the first one is used in discussions, hence:

$$a_{\textbf{p}}(t)=-i\int_{t_0}^{t}dt'\langle \textbf{p}|e^{-i\int_{t'}^{t}\hat{H}(t'')dt''}\hat{H}_I(t')e^{-i\int_{t_0}^{t'}\hat{H}_0(t'')dt''}|{\psi(t_0)}\rangle \quad (1.4)$$

Equation $(1.4)$ is also known as time reversed S-matrix amplitude and it gives the probability of photoionization by a generic time-varying electric field.

==== Strong field approximation (SFA) ====
Strong field approximation (SFA), or Keldysh-Faisal-Reiss theory is a physical model, started in 1964 by the Russian physicist Keldysh, is currently used to describe the behavior of atoms (and molecules) in intense laser fields.

SFA is the starting theory for discussing both high harmonic generation and attosecond pump-probe interaction with atoms.

The main assumption made in SFA is that the free-electron dynamics is dominated by the laser field, while the Coulomb potential is regarded as a negligible perturbation.

This fact re-shapes equation $(1.4)$ into:

$$a_{\textbf{p}}^{SFA}(t)=-i\int_{t_0}^{t}dt'\langle \textbf{p}|e^{-i\int_{t'}^{t}\hat{H}_{V}(t'')dt''}\hat{H}_I(t')e^{-i\int_{t_0}^{t'}\hat{H}_0(t'')dt''}|{\psi(t_0)}\rangle \quad (1.4)$$

where, $\hat{H}_V=\frac{1}{2}(\hat{\textbf{p}}+\textbf{A}(t))^2$ is the Volkov Hamiltonian, here expressed for simplicity in the velocity gauge, with $\textbf{A}(t)$, $\textbf{E}(t)=-\frac{\partial \textbf{A}(t)}{\partial t}$, the electromagnetic vector potential.

At this point, to keep the discussion at its basic level, lets consider an atom with a single energy level $|0\rangle$, ionization energy $I_P$ and populated by a single electron (single active electron approximation).

We can consider the initial time of the wave function dynamics as $t_0=-\infty$, and we can assume that initially the electron is in the atomic ground state $|0\rangle$.

So that,

$\hat{H}_0|0\rangle=-I_P|0\rangle$ and $|\psi(t)\rangle=e^{-i\int_{-\infty}^{t'}\hat{H}_0dt}|0\rangle=e^{I_Pt'}|0\rangle$

Moreover, we can regard the continuum states as plane-wave functions state, $\langle\textbf{r}|\textbf{p}\rangle=(2\pi)^{-\frac{3}{2}}e^{i\textbf{p}\cdot{\textbf{r}}}$.

This is a rather simplified assumption, a more reasonable choice would have been to use as continuum state the exact atom scattering states.

The time evolution of simple plane-wave states with the Volkov Hamiltonian is given by:

$$\langle\textbf{p}|e^{-i\int_{t'}^{t}\hat{H}_{V}(t'')dt''}=\langle\textbf{p}+\textbf{A}(t)|e^{-i\int_{t'}^{t}(\textbf{p}+\textbf{A}(t''))^2dt''}$$

here for consistency with Eq. $(1.4)$ the evolution has already been properly converted into the length gauge.

As a consequence, the final momentum distribution of a single electron in a single-level atom, with ionization potential $I_P$, is expressed as:

$a_{\textbf{p}}(t)^{SFA}=-i\int_{-\infty}^{t} \textbf{E}(t')\cdot \textbf{d}[\textbf{p}+\textbf{A}(t')] e^{+i(I_Pt'-S(t,t'))}dt' \quad (1.5)$

where,

$$\textbf{d}[\textbf{p}+\textbf{A}(t')]=\langle\textbf{p}+\textbf{A}(t')|\hat{\textbf{r}}|0 \rangle$$

is the dipole expectation value (or transition dipole moment), and

$$S(t,t')=\int_{t'}^{t}\frac{1}{2}(\textbf{p}+\textbf{A}(t''))^2dt''$$

is the semiclassical action.

The result of Eq. $(1.5)$ is the basic tool to understand phenomena like:

- The high harmonic generation process, which is typically the result of strong field interaction of noble gases with an intense low-frequency pulse,
- Attosecond pump-probe experiments with simple atoms.
- The debate on tunneling time.

===== Weak attosecond pulse-strong-IR-fields-atoms interactions =====
Attosecond pump-probe experiments with simple atoms is a fundamental tool to measure the time duration of an attosecond pulse and to explore several quantum proprieties of matter.

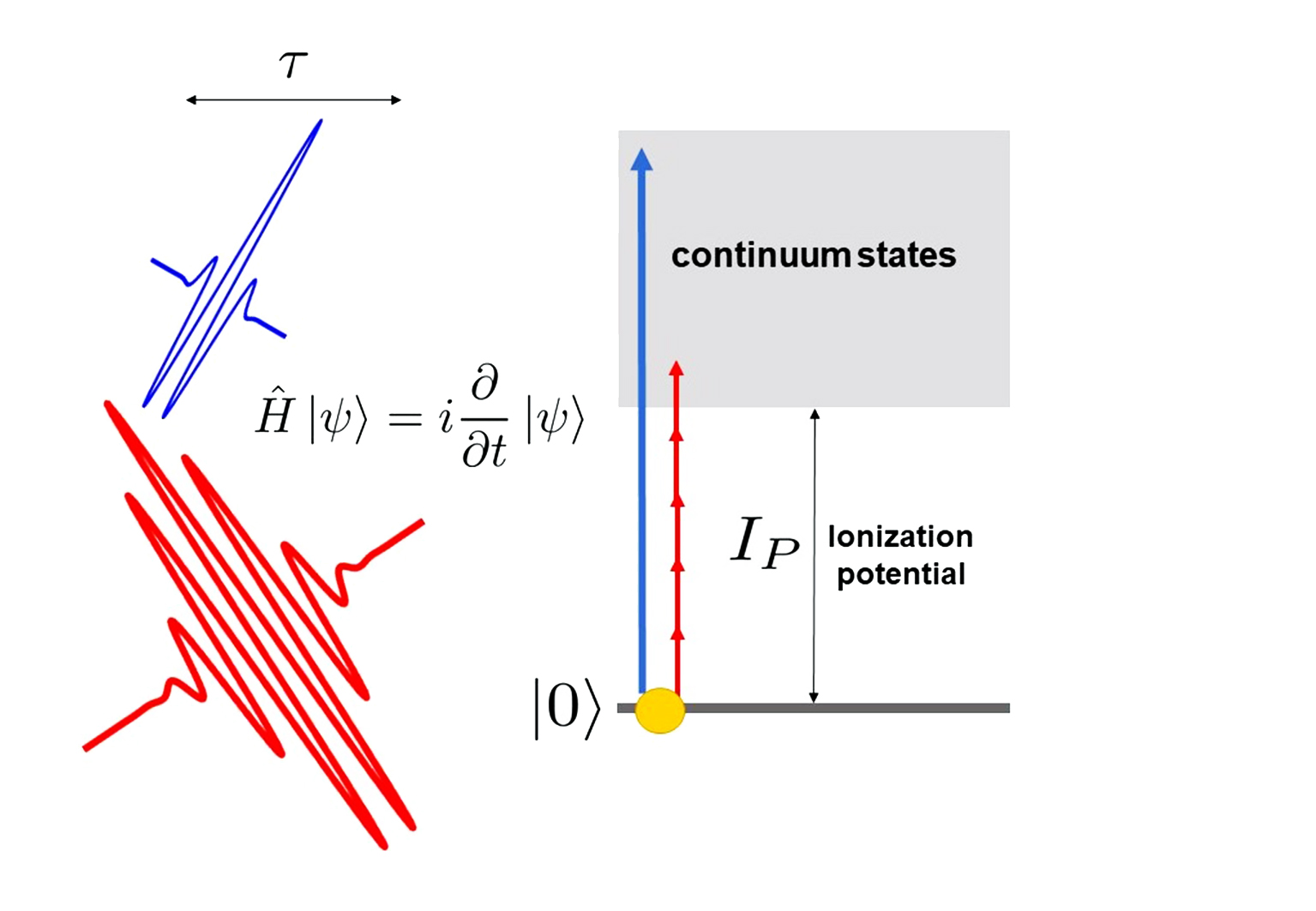
Scheme of a strong IR field and a delayed attosecond XUV pulse interacting with a single electron in a single-level atom. The XUV can ionize the electron, which "jumps" in the continuum by direct ionization (blue path in the figure). The IR pulse, later, "streaks" up and down in energy the photo-electron. After the interaction, the electron has final energy which can be subsequently detected and measured (e.g. time-of-flight apparatus). The multi-photon ionization process (red path in the figure) is also possible, but, since it is relevant in different energetic region, it can be disregarded.

This kind of experiments can be easily described within strong field approximation by exploiting the results of Eq. $(1.5)$, as discussed below.

As a simple model, consider the interaction between a single active electron in a single-level atom and two fields: an intense femtosecond infrared (IR) pulse ($(\textbf{E}_{IR}(t),\textbf{A}_{IR}(t))$,

and a weak attosecond pulse (centered in the extreme ultraviolet (XUV) region) $(\textbf{E}_{XUV}(t),\textbf{A}_{XUV}(t))$.

Then, by substituting these fields to $(1.5)$ it results

$$a_{\textbf{p}}(t)=-i\int_{-\infty}^{t} (\textbf{E}_{XUV}(t')+\textbf{E}_{IR}(t'))\cdot \textbf{d}[\textbf{p}+\textbf{A}_{XUV}(t')+\textbf{A}_{IR}(t')]  e^{+i(I_Pt'-S(t,t'))}dt' \quad (1.6)$$

with

$$S(t,t')=\int_{t'}^{t}\frac{1}{2}(\textbf{p}+\textbf{A}_{IR}(t'')+\textbf{A}_{XUV}(t''))^2dt''$$.

At this point, we can divide Eq. $(1.6)$ in two contributions: direct ionization and strong field ionization (multiphoton regime), respectively.

Typically, these two terms are relevant in different energetic regions of the continuum.

Consequently, for typical experimental condition, the latter process is disregarded, and only direct ionization from the attosecond pulse is considered.

Then, since the attosecond pulse is weaker than the infrared one, it holds $\textbf{A}_{IR}(t)>>\textbf{A}_{XUV}(t)$. Thus, $\textbf{A}_{XUV}(t)$ is typically neglected in Eq. $(1.6)$.

In addition to that, we can re-write the attosecond pulse as a delayed function with respect to the IR field, $[\textbf{A}_{IR}(t),\textbf{E}_{XUV}(t-\tau)]$.

Therefore, the probability distribution, $|a_{\textbf{p}}(\tau)|^2$, of finding an electron ionized in the continuum with momentum $\textbf{p}$, after the interaction has occurred (at $t=\infty$), in a pump-probe experiments,

with an intense IR pulse and a delayed-attosecond XUV pulse, is given by:

$$a_{\textbf{p}}(\tau)=-i\int_{-\infty}^{\infty} \textbf{E}_{XUV}(t-\tau)\cdot \textbf{d}[\textbf{p}+\textbf{A}_{IR}(t)]  e^{+i(I_Pt-S(t))}dt \quad (1.7)$$

with

$$S(t)=\frac{1}{2}|\textbf{p}|^2t+\int_{t}^{\infty}(\textbf{p}\cdot\textbf{A}_{IR}(t')+\frac{1}{2}|\textbf{A}_{IR}(t')|^2)dt'$$

Equation $(1.7)$ describes the photoionization phenomenon of two-color interaction (XUV-IR) with a single-level atom and single active electron.

This peculiar result can be regarded as a quantum interference process between all the possible ionization paths, started by a delayed XUV attosecond pulse, with a following motion in the continuum states driven by a strong IR field.

The resulting 2D photo-electron (momentum, or equivalently energy, vs delay) distribution is called streaking trace.

== Techniques ==
Here are listed and discussed some of the most common techniques and approaches pursued in attosecond research centers.

=== Metrology with photo-electron spectroscopy (FROG-CRAB) ===
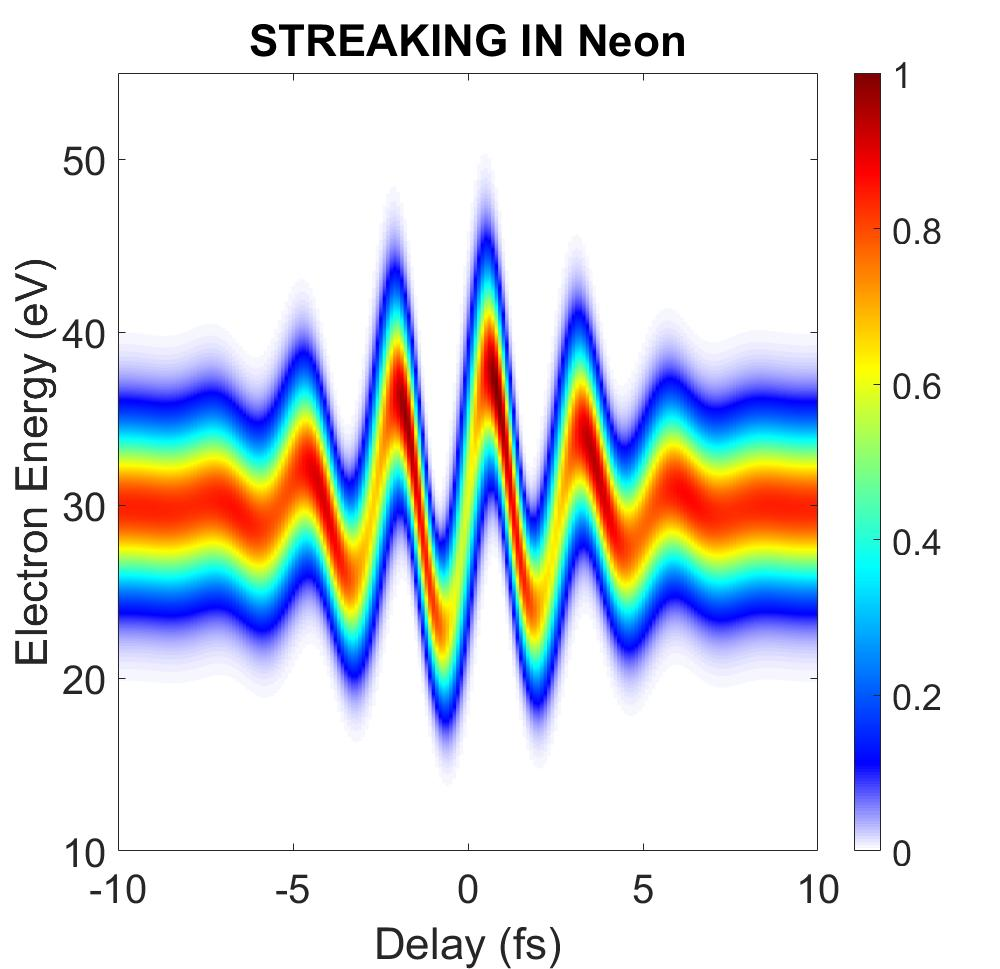
Simulation of a streaking trace in Neon. The attosecond pulse duration is 350 as, with central wavelength at the 33 harmonics of an 800 nm laser. The 800 nm pulse, which has the role of streaking up and down the photoelectron trace, has a duration of 7 fs with a peak intensity of 5 TW/cm^{2}.

A daily challenge in attosecond science is to characterize the temporal proprieties of the attosecond pulses used in any pump-probe experiments with atoms, molecules or solids.

The most used technique is based on the frequency-resolved optical gating for a complete reconstruction of attosecond bursts (FROG-CRAB).

The main advantage of this technique is that it allows to exploit the corroborated frequency-resolved optical gating (FROG) technique, developed in 1991 for picosecond-femtosecond pulse characterization, to the attosecond field.

Complete reconstruction of attosecond bursts (CRAB) is an extension of FROG and it is based on the same idea for the field reconstruction.

In other words, FROG-CRAB is based on the conversion of an attosecond pulse into an electron wave-packet that is freed in the continuum by atomic photoionization, as already described with Eq.$(1.7)$.

The role of the low-frequency driving laser pulse( e.g. infra-red pulse) is to behave as gate for the temporal measurement.

Then, by exploring different delays between the low-frequency and the attosecond pulse a streaking trace (or streaking spectrogram) can be obtained.

This 2D-spectrogram is later analyzed by a reconstruction algorithm with the goal of retrieving both the attosecond pulse and the IR pulse, with no need of a prior knowledge on any of them.

However, as Eq. $(1.7)$ pinpoints, the intrinsic limits of this technique is the knowledge on atomic dipole proprieties, in particular on the atomic dipole quantum phase.

The reconstruction of both the low-frequency field and the attosecond pulse from a streaking trace is typically achieved through iterative algorithms, such as:

- Principal component generalized projections algorithm (PCGPA).
- Volkov transform generalized projection algorithm (VTGPA).
- extended ptychographic iterative engine (ePIE).

== See also ==
- Femtochemistry
- Femtotechnology
- Ultrashort pulse
- Chirped pulse amplification
- Free-electron laser
- Attosecond chronoscopy
