= Ferenc Krausz =

Hungarian physicist (born 1962)

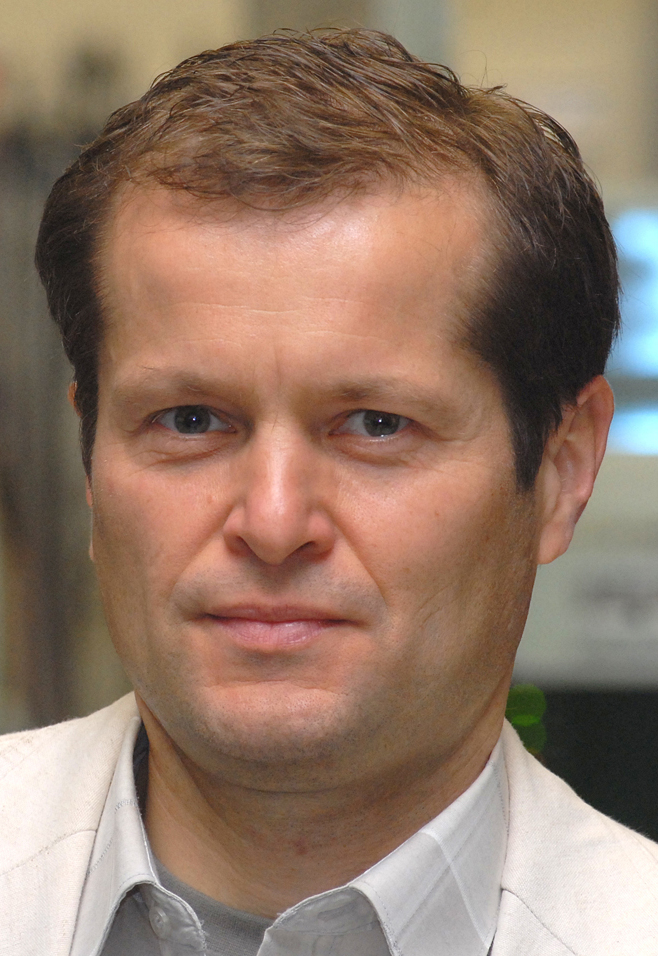
- Krausz in 2010
- Born: 17 May 1962 (age 64); Mór, Hungarian People's Republic
- Education: Eötvös Loránd University (BSc); Budapest University of Technology and Economics (MSc); Vienna University of Technology (MSc, PhD, Dr. habil.)
- Known for: First attosecond light source
- Awards: Wolf Prize in Physics (2022); BBVA Foundation Frontiers of Knowledge Award (2022); Nobel Prize in Physics (2023)
- Scientific career
- Fields: Attosecond physics
- Institutions: Max Planck Institute for Quantum Optics; LMU Munich; University of Hong Kong
- Thesis: Erzeugung ultrakurzer Lichtimpulse in Neodymium-Glaslasern (1991)
- Doctoral advisor: Arnold Schmidt
- Website: https://attoworld.de/

Ferenc Krausz (born 17 May 1962) is a Hungarian physicist working in attosecond science. He was a director at the Max Planck Institute of Quantum Optics and a professor of experimental physics at LMU Munich in Germany. His research team generated and measured the first attosecond light pulse and used it for capturing electrons' motion inside atoms, marking the birth of attophysics. In 2023, jointly with Pierre Agostini and Anne L'Huillier, he was awarded the Nobel Prize in Physics. Since November 2025, he has been Chair Professor at Department of Physics at the University of Hong Kong, Pokfulam, Hong Kong.

== Academic career ==
From 1981 until 1985 Krausz studied theoretical physics at Eötvös Loránd University and electrical engineering at the Technical University of Budapest in Hungary. From 1987 to 1991 he graduated with a PhD at the Technical University of Vienna, in Austria, and from 1991 to 1993 he also did his habilitation there. 1996–1998 he became associate professor, from 1999 until 2004 professor of electrical engineering at the same institute.

In 2003, he was appointed director at the Max Planck Institute for Quantum Optics in Garching, and in 2004 became chair of experimental physics at LMU Munich.

In November 2025, he was appointed Chair Professor at Department of Physics at the University of Hong Kong, Pokfulam, Hong Kong.

== Honors and awards ==
- 2006 - Gottfried Wilhelm Leibniz Prize
- 2006 – Royal Photographic Society Progress medal and Honorary Fellowship
- 2009 – elected a Fellow of Optica
- 2013 – Otto Hahn Prize
- 2015 – selected Clarivate Citation laureate in Physics with Paul Corkum "for contributions to the development of attosecond physics."
- 2016 – Member of the German Academy of Sciences Leopoldina.
- 2019 – Vladilen Letokhov Medal.
- 2022 – Wolf Prize in Physics with Anne L'Huillier and Corkum "for pioneering contributions to ultrafast laser science and attosecond physics".
- 2022 – BBVA Foundation Frontiers of Knowledge Award in Basic Sciences with L'Huillier and Corkum.
- 2023 – Nobel Prize in Physics with L'Huillier and Pierre Agostini "for experimental methods that generate attosecond pulses of light for the study of electron dynamics in matter."
