= Coulomb explosion =

Injection of EM radiation into a solid, resulting in bond breakage

Animation of Coulomb explosion of a cluster of atoms. The big circles are atoms; their hue indicates charge (red is neutral, green is positive). The small circles are electrons; their hue indicates kinetic energy. Because the electrons move so quickly, on this time-scale they are seen only stroboscopically.

A Coulombic explosion is a condensed-matter physics process in which a molecule or crystal lattice is destroyed by the Coulombic repulsion between its constituent atoms. Coulombic explosions are a prominent technique in laser-based machining, and appear naturally in certain high-energy reactions.

== Mechanism ==
A Coulombic explosion begins when an intense electric field (often from a laser) excites the valence electrons in a solid, ejecting them from the system and leaving behind positively charged ions. The chemical bonds holding the solid together are weakened by the loss of the electrons, enabling the Coulombic repulsion between the ions to overcome them. The result is an explosion of ions and electrons – a plasma.

The laser must be very intense to produce a Coulomb explosion. If it is too weak, the energy given to the electrons will be transferred to the ions via electron-phonon coupling. This will cause the entire material to heat up, melt, and thermally ablate away as a plasma. The end result is similar to Coulomb explosion, except that any fine structures in the material will be damaged by thermal melting.

It may be shown that the Coulomb explosion occurs in the same parameter regime as the superradiant phase transition i.e. when the destabilizing interactions become overwhelming and dominate over the oscillatory phonon-solid binding motions.

== Technological use ==
A Coulomb explosion is a "cold" alternative to the dominant laser etching technique of thermal ablation, which depends on local heating, melting, and vaporization of molecules and atoms using less-intense beams. Pulse brevity down only to the nanosecond regime is sufficient to localize thermal ablation – before the heat is conducted far, the energy input (pulse) has ended. Nevertheless, thermally ablated materials may seal pores important in catalysis or battery operation, and recrystallize or even burn the substrate, thus changing the physical and chemical properties at the etch site. In contrast, even light foams remain unsealed after ablation by Coulomb explosion.

Coulomb explosions for industrial machining are made with ultra-short (picosecond or femtoseconds) laser pulses. The enormous beam intensities required (10–400 terawatt per square centimeter thresholds, depending on material) are only practical to generate, shape, and deliver for very brief instants of time. Coulomb explosion etching can be used in any material to bore holes, remove surface layers, and texture and microstructure surfaces; e.g., to control ink loading in printing presses.

== Appearance in nature ==
High speed camera imaging of alkali metals exploding in water has suggested the explosion is a coulomb explosion.

During a nuclear explosion based on the fission of uranium, 167 MeV is emitted in the form of a coulombic explosion between each prior nucleus of uranium, the repulsive electrostatic energy between the two fission daughter nuclei, translates into the kinetic energy of the fission products that results in both the primary driver of the blackbody radiation that rapidly generates the hot dense plasma/nuclear fireball formation and thus also both later blast and thermal effects.

Scientists at the University of Cologne Zoological Institute have suggested that coulomb explosion (specifically, the electrostatic repulsion of dissociated carboxyl groups of polyglutamic acid) may be part of the explosive action of nematocytes, the stinging cells in aquatic organisms of the phylum Cnidaria.

== Coulomb explosion imaging ==
Molecules are held together by a balance of charge between negative electrons and positive nuclei. When multiple electrons are expelled, either by laser irradiation or bombardment using highly charged ions, the remaining, mutually repulsive, nuclei fly apart in a Coulomb explosion. The structure of simple gas phase molecules can be determined by imaging which tracks the fragment trajectories. As of 2022 the method can work with up to 11-atom molecules.

== See also ==
- Laser engraving
- Laser cutting
- Tunnel ionization
- Coherent x-ray diffraction imaging
