= Roger Falcone =

American physicist (born 1952)

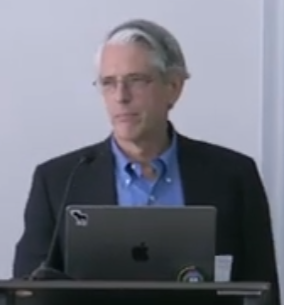
- At the 2023 panel discussion "Breakthroughs in Fusion"
- Born: Roger Wirth Falcone; June 27, 1952 (age 73)
- Employer: University of California, Berkeley

Roger Wirth Falcone (born June 27, 1952) is an American physicist at University of California, Berkeley where he is a professor of physics. He is an Elected Fellow at The Optical Society and the American Academy of Arts and Sciences, and he currently serves as the president of the American Physical Society. He is the former director of the Advanced Light Source at Lawrence Berkeley National Laboratory. He serves on the board of directors of the Fannie and John Hertz Foundation and is the chair of the International Scientific Advisory Committee of the Extreme-Light-Infrastructure.

His former students include Henry Kapteyn and Margaret Murnane.
