= Attosecond chronoscopy =

Attosecond chronoscopy are measurement techniques for attosecond-scale delays of atomic and molecular single photon processes like photoemission and photoionization. Ionization-delay measurements in atomic targets provide information about the timing of the photoelectric effect, resonances, electron correlations, and transport.

Attosecond chronoscopy deals with the time-resolved observation of ultrafast electronic processes of quantum physics of matter with applications to atoms, molecules. and solids. Typical time scales covered range from attoseconds (10^{−18} sec.) to femtoseconds (10^{−15} sec.). Realtime observations of such processes became possible with the availability of well-controlled subfemtosecond laser pulses. Chronoscopy can provide information complementary to that accessible through conventional spectroscopy. While spectroscopy aims at characterizing processes through measurements with the highest possible energy resolution but without time resolution, chronoscopy attempts to capture dynamical aspects of quantum dynamics through high time resolution but with only limited energy resolution. Important applications are non-stationary and decaying states, quantum transport and charge migration, irreversible processes (the "Arrow of time") and the loss of phase information called decoherence of a quantum system due to its interaction with the environment.

== See also ==
- Attophysics

== Bibliography ==
- Schultze, M.; Fiess, M.; Karpowicz, N.; Gagnon, J.; Korbman, M.; Hofstetter, M.; Neppl, S.; Cavalieri, A. L.; Komninos, Y.; Mercouris, T.; Nicolaides, C. A.; Pazourek, R.; Nagele, S.; Feist, J.; Burgdorfer, J.; Azzeer, A. M.; Ernstorfer, R.; Kienberger, R.; Kleineberg, U.; Goulielmakis, E.; Krausz, F.; Yakovlev, V. S. (2010-06-24). "Delay in Photoemission". Science. 328 (5986). American Association for the Advancement of Science (AAAS): 1658–1662. Bibcode:2010Sci...328.1658S. doi:10.1126/science.1189401. ISSN 0036-8075. PMID 20576884. S2CID 9984886.
- Krausz, Ferenc; Stockman, Mark I. (2014-02-28). "Attosecond metrology: from electron capture to future signal processing". Nature Photonics. 8 (3). Springer Science and Business Media LLC: 205–213. Bibcode:2014NaPho...8..205K. doi:10.1038/nphoton.2014.28. hdl:11858/00-001M-0000-0018-F768-7. ISSN 1749-4885.
- Pazourek, Renate; Nagele, Stefan; Burgdörfer, Joachim (2015-08-12). "Attosecond chronoscopy of photoemission". Reviews of Modern Physics. 87 (3). American Physical Society (APS): 765–802. Bibcode:2015RvMP...87..765P. doi:10.1103/revmodphys.87.765. ISSN 0034-6861.
- Seiffert, L.; Liu, Q.; Zherebtsov, S.; Trabattoni, A.; Rupp, P.; Castrovilli, M. C.; Galli, M.; Süßmann, F.; Wintersperger, K.; Stierle, J.; Sansone, G.; Poletto, L.; Frassetto, F.; Halfpap, I.; Mondes, V.; Graf, C.; Rühl, E.; Krausz, F.; Nisoli, M.; Fennel, T.; Calegari, F.; Kling, M. F. (2017-05-22). "Attosecond chronoscopy of electron scattering in dielectric nanoparticles". Nature Physics. 13 (8). Springer Science and Business Media LLC: 766–770. Bibcode:2017NatPh..13..766S. doi:10.1038/nphys4129. hdl:11311/1035706. ISSN 1745-2473. S2CID 125774969.
- Biswas, Shubhadeep; Förg, Benjamin; Ortmann, Lisa; Schötz, Johannes; Schweinberger, Wolfgang; Zimmermann, Tomáš; Pi, Liangwen; Baykusheva, Denitsa; Masood, Hafiz A.; Liontos, Ioannis; Kamal, Amgad M.; Kling, Nora G.; Alharbi, Abdullah F.; Alharbi, Meshaal; Azzeer, Abdallah M.; Hartmann, Gregor; Wörner, Hans J.; Landsman, Alexandra S.; Kling, Matthias F. (2020-05-11). "Probing molecular environment through photoemission delays". Nature Physics. 16 (7). Springer Science and Business Media LLC: 778–783. Bibcode:2020NatPh..16..778B. doi:10.1038/s41567-020-0887-8. ISSN 1745-2473. S2CID 218964901.
