= Reconstruction of attosecond beating by interference of two-photon transitions =

Technique in attosecond physics

Reconstruction of attosecond beating by interference of two-photon transitions, more commonly known as RABBITT or RABBIT for short, is a widely used technique for obtaining the relative phase and amplitude of attosecond pulses. This technique involves the interference of two-photon interband transitions in solids. It is especially suited for diagnostics on the temporal structure of XUV pulses. The reconstruction of attosecond beating by interference of two-photon transitions is a valuable tool for studying ultrafast processes in materials and can provide insight into the dynamics of electrons in solids.

== History ==
RABBITT was invented by Pierre Agostini, Harm Geert Muller and colleagues in 2001.
