= Pierre Agostini =

French physicist (born 1941)

- Agostini in 2026
- Born: 23 July 1941 (age 85); Tunis, French Tunisia
- Education: Aix-Marseille University (BEd, MAS, PhD)
- Known for: Above-threshold ionization RABBITT
- Awards: Gay-Lussac–Humboldt Prize (2003); William F. Meggers Award (2007); Nobel Prize in Physics (2023)
- Scientific career
- Fields: Attosecond physics
- Workplaces: CEA Saclay; Ohio State University
- Thesis: Appareillage permettant la réalisation de filtres multidiélectriques UV: Étude des couches Sb_{2}O_{3} cryolithe (1967)
- Website: physics.osu.edu/people/agostini.4

Pierre Agostini (French pronunciation: [pjɛʁ aɡɔstini]; born 23 July 1941) is a French experimental physicist and Emeritus professor at the Ohio State University in the United States, known for his pioneering work in strong-field laser physics and attosecond science. He is especially known for the observation of above-threshold ionization and the invention of the reconstruction of attosecond beating by interference of two-photon transitions (RABBITT) technique for characterization of attosecond light pulses. He was jointly awarded the 2023 Nobel Prize in Physics.

== Education and career ==
Pierre Agostini was born in Tunis, in the French protectorate of Tunisia, in 1941. He obtained his baccalauréat at the Prytanée national militaire school in 1959 in La Flèche, France.

Agostini delivering a lecture at Swinburne University of Technology Sarawak Campus.

Agostini studied physics at Aix-Marseille University, where he subsequently received a B.Ed. degree (licence d'enseignement) in physics in 1961, and an M.A.S. degree (diplôme d'études approfondies) in 1962. In 1968 he completed a doctoral degree there, on multilayer dielectric filters for the ultraviolet, titled Appareillage permettant la réalisation de filtres multidiélectriques UV : Étude des couches Sb_{2}O_{3}.

After his doctorate, he became a researcher at CEA Saclay in 1969 and stayed there until 2002. During this time, Agostini worked in the lab of Gérard Mainfray and Claude Manus, where he researched on multiphoton ionization using the powerful lasers there. They are the first to observe above-threshold ionization in 1979 in xenon gas.

In 2001, Agostini and his team at CEA Saclay along with Harm Geert Muller at the Dutch Foundation for Fundamental Research on Matter (FOM), using an advanced laser at the Laboratoire d'Optique Appliquée, managed to create a train of pulses each 250 attoseconds in duration. By recombining the ultrashort ultraviolet pulses with the original infrared light they created an interference effect that allowed him to characterize the length and repetition rate of the pulses.

Agostini was a visiting scientist at the Brookhaven National Laboratory in the U.S. state of New York between 2002 and 2004, where he worked in Louis F. DiMauro's group. He became professor of physics at the Ohio State University (OSU) in 2005 and ran a laboratory jointly with Louis F. DiMauro who moved a year earlier to OSU. Agostini became emeritus professor at OSU in 2018.

== Honors and awards ==
Agostini received the Gustave Ribaud prize in 1995 from the French Academy of Sciences. In 2003, he received the Gay-Lussac–Humboldt Prize and the Joop Los fellowship from the Dutch Foundation for Fundamental Research on Matter (FOM), he also received the William F. Meggers Award in Spectroscopy in 2007 from the Optical Society of America (OSA), and is a Humboldt Fellow. He was elected a Fellow of OSA in 2008 “for leadership in the development of innovative experiments providing major insights into the dynamics of the nonlinear response of atoms and molecules submitted to strong infrared laser pulses.”

In 2023, he received the Nobel Prize in Physics for "experimental methods that generate attosecond pulses of light for the study of electron dynamics in matter" along with Anne L'Huillier and Ferenc Krausz.
