= Ultrafast X-ray =

Ultrafast X-rays or ultrashort X-ray pulses are femtosecond x-ray pulses with wavelengths occurring at interatomic distances. This beam uses the X-ray's inherent abilities to interact at the level of atomic nuclei and core electrons. This ability combined with the shorter pulses at 30 femtosecond could capture the change in position of atoms, or molecules during phase transitions, chemical reactions, and other transient processes in physics, chemistry, and biology.

== Fundamental transitions and processes ==
Ultrafast X-ray diffraction (time-resolved X-ray diffraction) can surpass ultrashortpulse visible techniques, which are limited to detecting structures on the level of valence and free electrons. Ultrashort pulse X-ray techniques are able to resolve atomic scales, where dynamic structural changes and reactions occur in the interior of a material.

== See also ==
- Stanford PULSE Institute for ultrafast x-ray science
- Ultrafast laser spectroscopy
