= Paul Corkum =

Canadian physicist (born 1943)

- Born: Paul Bruce Corkum; October 30, 1943 (age 82); Saint John, New Brunswick, Canada
- Education: Acadia University (BSc.); Lehigh University (MSc.), (PhD)
- Awards: Wolf Prize in Physics (2022); BBVA Foundation Frontiers of Knowledge Award (2022); APS Medal (2025)
- Scientific career
- Fields: Attosecond physics Laser science
- Workplaces: National Research Council of Canada; University of Ottawa
- Thesis: The relation between magnetohydrodynamics and space and time dependent correlation functions (1972)
- Doctoral advisor: James Alan MacLennan Jr.

Paul Bruce Corkum OC OOnt FRSC FRS (born October 30, 1943) is a Canadian physicist specializing in attosecond physics and laser science. He holds a joint University of Ottawa–NRC chair in attosecond photonics. He also holds academic positions at Texas A&M University and the University of New Mexico. Corkum is both a theorist and an experimentalist. He is known for developing the theory of attosecond physics.

== Biography and research ==
Paul Corkum was born in Saint John, New Brunswick. He obtained his BSc (1965) from Acadia University, Nova Scotia, and his MSc (1967) and PhD (1972) in theoretical physics from Lehigh University, Pennsylvania. He was a physicist at the National Research Council of Canada (1973-2008), and was then appointed as a professor of physics at the University of Ottawa. He won several awards for his work on laser science.

In the 1980s he developed a model of the ionization of atoms (i.e. plasma production) and on this basis proposed a new approach to making X-ray lasers, under the name of optical field ionization (OFI). The OFI lasers are today one of the most important developments in X-ray laser research.

In the early 1990s in strong field atomic physics there were discoveries of high harmonic generation and correlated double ionization (in which an atom can absorb hundreds of photons and emit two electrons). Corkum's recollision electron model served as the basis for the generation of attosecond pulses from lasers. With this method in 2001 Corkum with colleagues in Vienna succeeded in demonstrating for the first time laser pulse lengths lasting less than 1 femtosecond. The method was used for the generation of higher harmonics and (as a type of laser tunneling microscope) for exploration of atoms and molecules in the angstrom range and below.

Corkum's recollision electron physics has led to many advances in understanding the interactions among coherent electrons, coherent light, and coherent atoms or molecules. The recollision electron can be thought of as an electron interferometer built by laser light generated from atoms or molecules. As an interferometer, the recollision electron can be used to measure atomic and molecular orbitals by means of interfering waves from the bound electrons and the recollision electrons.

From 1997 to 2009, he was the adjunct professor of physics at McMaster University.

In 2018, Corkum was the first Canadian to be awarded the Isaac Newton Medal by the Institute of Physics for his outstanding contributions to experimental physics and to attosecond science and for pioneering work which has led to the first-ever experimental image of a molecular orbital and the first-ever space–time image of an attosecond pulse. Attosecond techniques can freeze the motion of electrons within atoms and molecules, observe quantum mechanical orbitals, and follow chemical reactions.

== Honors and awards ==
=== Awards ===
- 1996 Gold Medal for Lifetime Achievement in Physics (Canadian Association of Physicists)
- 1999 Einstein Award (Society for Optical and Quantum Electronics)
- 2003 Tory Medal (Royal Society of Canada)
- 2003 Queen Elizabeth II Golden Jubilee Medal
- 2005 Fellow of the Royal Society
- 2005 Quantum Electronics Award (IEEE)
- 2005 Charles Hard Townes Award (Optical Society of America)
- 2006 Killam Prize (Canada Council for the Arts)
- 2006 Arthur L. Schawlow Prize in Laser Science (American Physical Society)
- 2008 John C. Polanyi Award (NSERC)
- 2009 Gerhard Herzberg Canada Gold Medal for Science and Engineering (NSERC)
- 2010 Fellow of The Optical Society
- 2013 King Faisal International Prize for Physics (King Faisal Foundation).
- 2013 Royal Photographic Society Progress medal and Honorary Fellowship awarded in recognition of any invention, research, publication or other contribution which has resulted in an important advance in the scientific or technological development of photography or imaging in the widest sense
- 2013 Harvey Prize
- 2014 Frederic Ives Medal/Jarus W. Quinn Prize
- 2015 Lomonosov Gold Medal
- 2015 selected Clarivate Citation laureate in Physics with Ferenc Krausz "for contributions to the development of attosecond physics."
- 2017 Royal Medal
- 2018 Institute of Physics Isaac Newton Medal
- 2018 SPIE Gold Medal
- 2019 The Willis E. Lamb Award for Laser Science and Quantum Optics
- 2022 Wolf Prize in Physics
- 2022 BBVA Foundation Frontiers of Knowledge Award in Basic Sciences
- 2025 APS Medal for Exceptional Achievement in Research.
- 2026 IEEE/RSE James Clerk Maxwell Medal

=== Membership ===
- Femtosecond Science Group at the Steacie Institute for Molecular Sciences (Founder)
- NRC Atomic, Molecular and Optical Science Group (Program Leader)
- Order of Canada (Officer).
- Order of Ontario
- Royal Society of London (Member)
- Royal Society of Canada (Member)
- US National Academy of Sciences (Member)

== Selected works ==
- Corkum PB (1993). "Plasma perspective on strong field multiphoton ionization". Physical Review Letters. 71 (13): 1994–1997. Bibcode:1993PhRvL..71.1994C. doi:10.1103/PhysRevLett.71.1994. PMID 10054556. S2CID 29947935.
- with N. H. Burnett, M. Y. Ivanov: Corkum, P. B.; Burnett, N. H.; Ivanov, M. Y. (1994). "Subfemtosecond pulses". Optics Letters. 19 (22): 1870–1872. Bibcode:1994OptL...19.1870C. doi:10.1364/OL.19.001870. PMID 19855681.
- with H. Niikura, F. Legaré, R. Hasbani, M. Ivanov, D. Villeneuve: Niikura H, Légaré F, Hasbani R, Ivanov MY, Villeneuve DM, Corkum PB (2003). "Probing molecular dynamics with attosecond resolution using correlated wave packet pairs". Nature. 421 (6925): 826–829. Bibcode:2003Natur.421..826N. doi:10.1038/nature01430. PMID 12594508. S2CID 4318208.
- with Ferenc Krausz: Corkum, P. B.; Krausz, Ferenc (2007). "Attosecond Science". Nature Physics. 3 (6): 381–387. Bibcode:2007NatPh...3..381C. doi:10.1038/nphys620.
- with Chandrasekhar Joshi: Joshi, Chandrashekhar J.; Corkum, Paul (January 1995). "Interaction of ultra-intense laser light with matter" (PDF). Physics Today. 48 (1): 36. Bibcode:1995PhT....48a..36J. doi:10.1063/1.881451. Archived from the original (PDF) on 2014-02-25.
- with Donna Strickland: Strickland, D.; Corkum, P. B. (1994). "Resistance of short pulses to self-focusing". JOSA B. 11 (3): 492–497. Bibcode:1994JOSAB..11..492S. doi:10.1364/JOSAB.11.000492. S2CID 122336320.
