= Photoionization =

Ion formation via a photon interacting with a molecule or atom

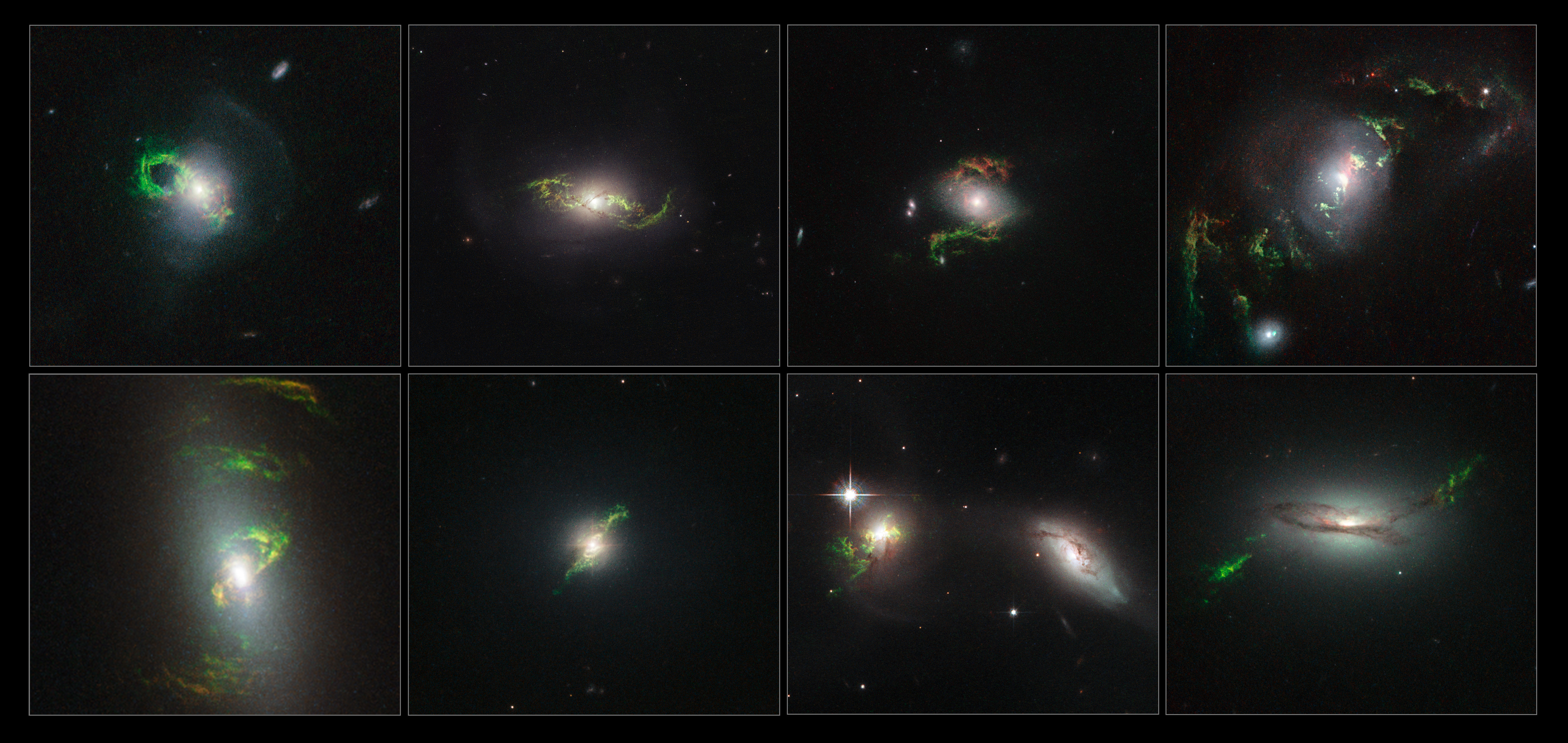
Photoionization is the process that makes once-invisible filaments in deep space glow.

Photoionization is the physical process in which an ion is formed from the interaction of a photon with an atom or molecule.

== Cross section ==
Not every interaction between a photon and an atom, or molecule, will result in photoionization. The probability of photoionization is related to the photoionization cross section of the species – the probability of an ionization event conceptualized as a hypothetical cross-sectional area. This cross section depends on the energy of the photon (proportional to its wavenumber) and the species being considered i.e. it depends on the structure of the molecular species. In the case of molecules, the photoionization cross-section can be estimated by examination of Franck-Condon factors between a ground-state molecule and the target ion. This can be initialized by computing the vibrations of a molecule and associated cation (post ionization) using quantum chemical software e.g. QChem. For photon energies below the ionization threshold, the photoionization cross-section is near zero. But with the development of pulsed lasers it has become possible to create extremely intense, coherent light where multi-photon ionization may occur via sequences of excitations and relaxations. At even higher intensities (around 10^{15} – 10^{16} W/cm^{2} of infrared or visible light), non-perturbative phenomena such as barrier suppression ionization and rescattering ionization are observed.

== Multi-photon ionization ==
Several photons of energy below the ionization threshold may actually combine their energies to ionize an atom. This probability decreases rapidly with the number of photons required, but the development of very intense, pulsed lasers still makes it possible. In the perturbative regime (below about 10^{14} W/cm^{2} at optical frequencies), the probability of absorbing N photons depends on the laser-light intensity I as I^{N}. For higher intensities, this dependence becomes invalid due to the then occurring AC Stark effect.

Resonance-enhanced multiphoton ionization (REMPI) is a technique applied to the spectroscopy of atoms and small molecules in which a tunable laser can be used to access an excited intermediate state.

Above-threshold ionization (ATI) is an extension of multi-photon ionization where even more photons are absorbed than actually would be necessary to ionize the atom. The excess energy gives the released electron higher kinetic energy than the usual case of just-above threshold ionization. More precisely, the system will have multiple peaks in its photoelectron spectrum which are separated by the photon energies, indicating that the emitted electron has more kinetic energy than in the normal (lowest possible number of photons) ionization case. The electrons released from the target will have approximately an integer number of photon-energies more kinetic energy.

== Tunnel ionization ==
When either the laser intensity is further increased or a longer wavelength is applied as compared with the regime in which multi-photon ionization takes place, a quasi-stationary approach can be used and results in the distortion of the atomic potential in such a way that only a relatively low and narrow barrier between a bound state and the continuum states remains. Then, the electron can tunnel through or for larger distortions even overcome this barrier. These phenomena are called tunnel ionization and over-the-barrier ionization, respectively.

== See also ==
- Ion source
- Radiolysis
