= Above-threshold ionization =

Ionization by more photons than are required

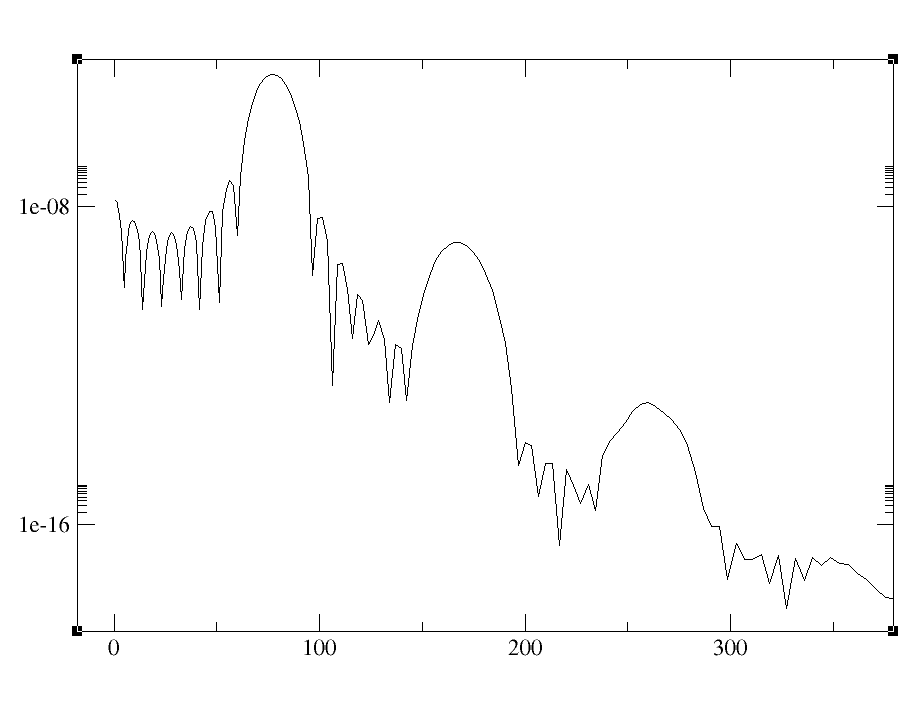
The angle-integrated photoelectron spectrum resulting from a laser interacting with a hydrogen atom. The x axis marks the electron kinetic energies $E_k$ in eV, whilst the y axis is the differential probability. The first three above-threshold ionization peaks are visible in the image.

In atomic, molecular, and optical physics, above-threshold ionization (ATI) is a multi-photon effect where an atom is ionized with more than the energetically required number of photons. It was first observed in 1979 by Pierre Agostini and colleagues in xenon gas.

== Photoelectrons ==
In the case of ATI the photoelectron peaks should appear at

$$E_s = (n + s) \hbar \omega - W,$$

where the integer n represents the minimal number of photons absorbed, and the integer s represents the number of additional photons absorbed. W is the ionization energy, and $E_s$ is the electron kinetic energy of the peak corresponding to s additional photons being absorbed.

== Structure ==
It typically has a strong maximum at the minimal number of photons to ionize the system, with successive peaks (known as ATI peaks) separated by the photon energy and thus corresponding to higher numbers of photons being absorbed.

In the non-perturbative regime the bound states are dressed with the electric field, shifting the ionization energy. If the ponderomotive energy of the field is greater than the photon energy $\omega$, then the first peak disappears.

== Features from ultrashort pulses ==
High intensity ultrashort pulse lasers can create ATI features with 20 or more peaks. The photoelectron spectrum of electron energies is continuous since actual light sources contain a spread of energies.
