= Tunnel ionization =

Quantum effect in physics

In physics, tunnel ionization is a process in which electrons in an atom (or a molecule) tunnel through the potential barrier and escape from the atom (or molecule). In an intense electric field, the potential barrier of an atom (molecule) is distorted drastically. Therefore, as the length of the barrier that electrons have to pass decreases, the electrons can escape from the atom's potential more easily. Tunneling ionization is a quantum mechanical phenomenon since in the classical picture an electron does not have sufficient energy to overcome the potential barrier of the atom.

When the atom is in a DC external field, the Coulomb potential barrier is lowered and the electron has an increased, non-zero probability of tunnelling through the potential barrier. In the case of an alternating electric field, the direction of the electric field reverses after the half period of the field. The ionized electron may come back to its parent ion. The electron may recombine with the nucleus (nuclei) and its kinetic energy is released as light (high harmonic generation). If the recombination does not occur, further ionization may proceed by collision between high-energy electrons and a parent atom (molecule). This process is known as non-sequential ionization.

== DC tunneling ionization ==
Tunneling ionization from the ground state of a hydrogen atom in an electrostatic (DC) field was solved schematically by Lev Landau, using parabolic coordinates. This provides a simplified physical system that given it proper exponential dependence of the ionization rate on the applied external field. When $E \ll E_a$, the ionization rate for this system is given by:

$$w = 4 \omega_a \frac{E_a}{\left|E\right|} \exp\left[ -\frac{2}{3}\frac{E_a}{\left|E\right|} \right]$$

Landau expressed this in atomic units, where $m_\text{e} = e = \hbar = 1$. In SI units the previous parameters can be expressed as:

$$E_a = \frac{m_\text{e}^2 e^5}{(4\pi \epsilon_0)^3 \hbar^4}$$,
$$\omega_a = \frac{m_\text{e} e^4}{(4\pi \epsilon_0)^2 \hbar^3}$$.

The ionization rate is the total probability current through the outer classical turning point. This rate is found using the WKB approximation to match the ground state hydrogen wavefunction through the suppressed coulomb potential barrier.

A more physically meaningful form for the ionization rate above can be obtained by noting that the Bohr radius and hydrogen atom ionization energy are given by

$$a_0 = \frac{4\pi \epsilon_0 \hbar^2}{m_\text{e} e^2}$$,
$$E_\text{ion}=R_\text{H} = \frac{m_\text{e} e^4}{8 \epsilon_0^2 h^2}$$,

where $R_\text{H} \approx \mathrm{13.6\, eV}$ is the Rydberg energy. Then, the parameters $E_a$ and $\omega_a$ can be written as

$E_a = \frac{2 R_\text{H}}{e a_0}$, $\omega_a = \frac{2 R_\text{H}}{\hbar}$.

so that the total ionization rate can be rewritten

$$w = 8 \frac{R_\text{H}}{\hbar} \frac{2 R_\text{H}/a_0}{\left|e E\right|} \exp\left[ -\frac{4}{3}\frac{R_\text{H}/a_0}{\left|eE\right|} \right]$$.

This form for the ionization rate $w$ emphasizes that the characteristic electric field needed for ionization $E_a = {2 E_\text{ion}} / {e a_0}$ is proportional to the ratio of the ionization energy $E_\text{ion}$ to the characteristic size of the electron's orbital $a_0$. Thus, atoms with low ionization energy (such as alkali metals) with electrons occupying orbitals with high principal quantum number $n$ (i.e. far down the periodic table) ionize most easily under a DC field. Furthermore, for a hydrogenic atom, the scaling of this characteristic ionization field goes as $Z^3$, where $Z$ is the nuclear charge. This scaling arises because the ionization energy scales as $\propto Z^2$ and the orbital radius as $\propto Z^{-1}$. More accurate and general formulas for the tunneling from Hydrogen orbitals can also be obtained.

As an empirical point of reference, the characteristic electric field $E_a$ for the ordinary hydrogen atom is about 51 V/Å (or 5.1×10^{3} MV/cm) and the characteristic frequency $\omega_a$ is 4.1×10^{4} THz.

== AC electric field ==
The ionization rate of a hydrogen atom in an alternating electric field, like that of a laser, can be treated, in the appropriate limit, as the DC ionization rate averaged over a single period of the electric field's oscillation. Multiphoton and tunnel ionization of an atom or a molecule describes the same process by which a bounded electron, through the absorption of more than one photon from the laser field, is ionized. The difference between them is a matter of definition under different conditions. They can henceforth be called multiphoton ionization (MPI) whenever the distinction is not necessary. The dynamics of the MPI can be described by finding the time evolution of the state of the atom which is described by the Schrödinger equation.

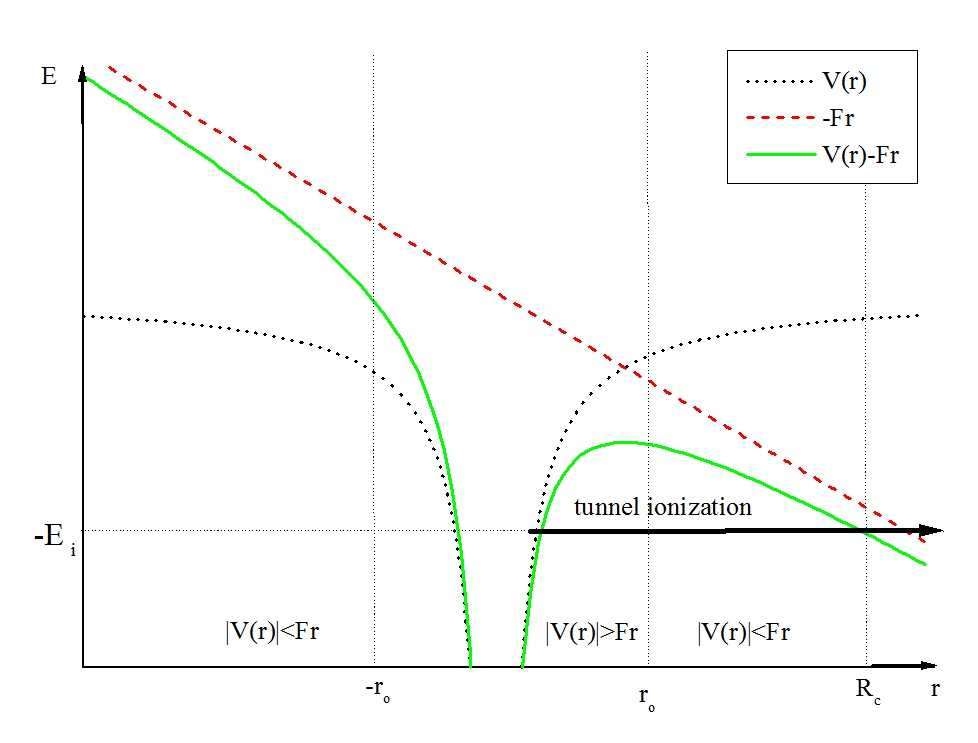
Combined potential of an atom and a uniform laser field. At distances $r < r_0$, the potential of the laser can be neglected, while at distances with $r > r_0$, the Coulomb potential is negligible compared to the potential of the laser field. The electron emerges from under the barrier at $r = R_c$. $E_\text{i}$ is the ionization potential of the atom.

When the intensity of the laser is strong, the lowest-order perturbation theory is not sufficient to describe the MPI process. In this case, the laser field on larger distances from the nucleus is more important than the Coulomb potential and the dynamic of the electron in the field should be properly taken into account. The first work in this category was published by Leonid Keldysh. He modeled the MPI process as a transition of the electron from the ground state of the atom to the Volkov states (the state of a free electron in the electromagnetic field). In this model, the perturbation of the ground state by the laser field is neglected and the details of atomic structure in determining the ionization probability are not taken into account. The major difficulty with Keldysh's model was its neglect of the effects of Coulomb interaction on the final state of the electron. As is observed from the figure, the Coulomb field is not very small in magnitude compared to the potential of the laser at larger distances from the nucleus. This is in contrast to the approximation made by neglecting the potential of the laser at regions near the nucleus. A. M. Perelomov, V. S. Popov and M. V. Terent'ev included the Coulomb interaction at larger internuclear distances. Their model (which is called the PPT model after their initials) was derived for short-range potential and includes the effect of the long-range Coulomb interaction through the first-order correction in the quasi-classical action. In the quasi-static limit, the PPT model approaches the ADK model by M. V. Ammosov, N. B. Delone, and V. P. Krainov.

Many experiments have been carried out on the MPI of rare gas atoms using strong laser pulses, through measuring both the total ion yield and the kinetic energy of the electrons. Here, one only considers the experiments designed to measure the total ion yield. Among these experiments are those by S. L. Chin et al., S. Augst et al. and T. Auguste et al. Chin et al. used a 10.6 μm CO_{2} laser in their experiment. Due to the very small frequency of the laser, the tunneling is strictly quasi-static, a characteristic that is not easily attainable using pulses in the near infrared or visible region of frequencies. These findings weakened the suspicion on the applicability of models basically founded on the assumption of a structureless atom. S. Larochelle et al. have compared the theoretically predicted ion versus intensity curves of rare gas atoms interacting with a Ti:sapphire laser with experimental measurement. They have shown that the total ionization rate predicted by the PPT model fits very well the experimental ion yields for all rare gases in the intermediate regime of Keldysh parameter.

=== Analytical formula for the rate of MPI ===
The dynamics of the MPI can be described by finding the time evolution of the state of the atom which is described by the Schrödinger equation. The form of this equation in the electric field gauge, assuming the single active electron (SAE) approximation and using dipole approximation, is the following

$$i\frac{\partial}{\partial t}\Psi(\mathbf{r},\,t)=-\frac{1}{2m}\nabla^2\Psi(\mathbf{r},\,t) + (\mathbf{E}(t)\cdot\mathbf{r}+V(\mathbf{r}))\Psi(\mathbf{r},\,t) ,$$

where $\mathbf{E}(t)$ is the electric field of the laser and $V(r)$ is the static Coulomb potential of the atomic core at the position of the active electron. By finding the exact solution of equation (1) for a potential $\sqrt{2 E_\text{i}}.\delta(\mathbf{r})$ ($E_\text{i}$ the magnitude of the ionization potential of the atom), the probability current $\mathbf{J}(\mathbf{r}, t)$ is calculated. Then, the total MPI rate from short-range potential for linear polarization, $W(\mathbf{E}, \omega)$, is found from

$$W(\mathbf{E}, \omega)=\lim_{x\to\infty}\int_0^\frac{2\pi}{\omega} \int_{-\infty}^\infty \int_{-\infty}^\infty \mathbf{J}(\mathbf{r}, t)\,dz\,dy\,dt$$

where $\omega$ is the frequency of the laser, which is assumed to be polarized in the direction of the $x$ axis. The effect of the ionic potential, which behaves like ${Z} / {r}$ ($Z$ is the charge of atomic or ionic core) at a long distance from the nucleus, is calculated through first order correction on the semi-classical action. The result is that the effect of ionic potential is to increase the rate of MPI by a factor of

$$I_\text{PPT}=(2(E_\text{i})^{\frac{3}{2}}/F)^{n^{*}}$$

Where $n^{*}=Z/\sqrt{2 E_\text{i} }$ and $F$ is the peak electric field of laser. Thus, the total rate of MPI from a state with quantum numbers $l$ and $m$ in a laser field for linear polarization is calculated to be

$$W_\text{PPT}=I_\text{PPT}W(\mathbf{E}, \omega)=|C_{n^{*}l^{*}}|^{2}\sqrt{\frac{6}{\pi}}f_{lm}E_{i}(2(2 E_\text{i})^{\frac{3}{2}}/F)^{2n^{*}-|m|-3/2}(1+\gamma^{2})^{|m/2|+3/4}A_{m}(\omega, \gamma)e^{-\frac{2}{3}g(\gamma)(2 E_\text{i})^{\frac{3}{2}}/F}$$

where $\gamma= \frac{\omega \sqrt {2 E_\text{i}}}{F}$ is the Keldysh's adiabaticity parameter and $l^{*} = n^{*} - 1$. The coefficients $f_{lm}$, $g(\gamma)$ and $C_{n^{*}l^{*}}$ are given by

$$f_{lm}= \frac{(2l+1)(l+|m|){!}}{2^{|m|}|m|{!}(l-|m|){!}}$$
$$g(\gamma)=\frac{3}{2\gamma} ((1+\frac{1}{2\gamma^{2}})\sinh^{-1}(\gamma)-\frac{\sqrt{1+\gamma^{2}}}{2\gamma})$$
$$|C_{n^{*}l^{*}}|^{2}= \frac{2^{2n^{*}}}{n^{*}\Gamma(n^{*}+l^{*}+1)\Gamma(n^{*}-l^{*})}$$

The coefficient $A_{m}(\omega, \gamma)$ is given by

$$A_{m}(\omega, \gamma)=\frac{4}{\sqrt{3\pi}}\frac{1}{|m|!}\frac{\gamma^{2}}{1+\gamma^{2}}\sum_{n>v}^{\infty}e^{-(n-v)\alpha(\gamma)}w_{m}\left(\sqrt{\frac{2\gamma}{\sqrt{1+\gamma^{2}}}(n-v)}\right)$$,

where

$$w_{m}(x)=e^{-x^{2}}\int_0^x (x^2-y^2)^m e^{y^2}\,dy$$
$$\alpha(\gamma)= 2(\sinh^{-1}(\gamma)-\frac{\gamma}{\sqrt{1+\gamma^{2}}})$$
$$v= \frac{E_\text{i}}{\omega}(1+\frac{1}{2\gamma^{2}})$$

The ADK model is the limit of the PPT model when $\gamma$ approaches zero (quasi-static limit). In this case, which is known as quasi-static tunnelling (QST), the ionization rate is given by

$$W_\text{ADK}=|C_{n^{*}l^{*}}|^{2}\sqrt{\frac{6}{\pi}}f_{lm}E_{i}(2(2 E_\text{i})^{\frac{3}{2}}/F)^{2n^{*}-|m|-3/2}e^{-(2(2 E_\text{i})^{\frac{3}{2}}/3F)}$$.

In practice, the limit for the QST regime is $\gamma < 1/2$. This is justified by the following consideration. Referring to the figure, the ease or difficulty of tunneling can be expressed as the ratio between the equivalent classical time it takes for the electron to tunnel out the potential barrier while the potential is bent down. This ratio is indeed $\gamma$, since the potential is bent down during half a cycle of the field oscillation and the ratio can be expressed as

$$\gamma =\frac {\tau_\text{T}} {\frac{1}{2}\tau_\text{L}}$$,

where $\tau_\text{T}$ is the tunneling time (classical time of flight of an electron through a potential barrier, and $\tau_\text{L}$ is the period of laser field oscillation.

=== Multiphoton ionization of molecules ===
Contrary to the abundance of theoretical and experimental work on the multiphoton ionization (MPI) of rare gas atoms, the amount of research on the prediction of the rate of MPI of neutral molecules was scarce until recently. Walsh et al. have measured the MPI rate of some diatomic molecules interacting with a 10.6 μm CO_{2} laser. They found that these molecules are tunnel-ionized as if they were structureless atoms with an ionization potential equivalent to that of the molecular ground state. A. Talebpour et al. were able to quantitatively fit the ionization yield of diatomic molecules interacting with a Ti:sapphire laser pulse. The conclusion of the work was that the MPI rate of a diatomic molecule can be predicted from the PPT model by assuming that the electron tunnels through a barrier given by ${Z_\text{eff}} / {r}$ instead of barrier ${1} / {r}$ which is used in the calculation of the MPI rate of atoms. The importance of this finding is in its practicality; the only parameter needed for predicting the MPI rate of a diatomic molecule is a single parameter, $Z_\text{eff}$. Using the semi-empirical model for the MPI rate of unsaturated hydrocarbons is feasible. This simplistic view ignores the ionization dependence on orientation of molecular axis with respect to polarization of the electric field of the laser, which is determined by the symmetries of the molecular orbitals. This dependence can be used to follow molecular dynamics using strong field multiphoton ionization.

== Tunneling time ==
The question of how long a tunneling particle spends inside the barrier region has remained unresolved since the early days of quantum mechanics. It is sometimes suggested that the tunneling time is instantaneous because both the Keldysh and the closely related Buttiker-Landauer times are imaginary (corresponding to the decay of the wavefunction under the barrier). In a recent publication the main competing theories of tunneling time are compared against experimental measurements using the attoclock in strong laser field ionization of helium atoms. Refined attoclock measurements reveal a real and not instantaneous tunneling delay time over a large intensity regime. It is found that the experimental results are compatible with the probability distribution of tunneling times constructed using a Feynman path integral (FPI) formulation. However, later work in atomic hydrogen has demonstrated that most of the tunneling time measured in the experiment is purely from the long-range Coulomb force exerted by the ion core on the outgoing electron.
