= Attosecond =

One quintillionth of a second

attosecond
- Unit system: SI
- Unit of: time
- Symbol: as

Conversions
1 as in ...	... is equal to ...
- SI units: 10^{−18} s

An attosecond (abbreviated as as) is a unit of time in the International System of Units (SI) equal to 10^{−18} or ^{1}/_{1 000 000 000 000 000 000} (one quintillionth) of a second.

An attosecond is to a second, as a second is to approximately 31.69 billion years.

The attosecond is a tiny unit, but it has various potential applications: it can observe oscillating molecules, the chemical bonds formed by atoms in chemical reactions, and other extremely tiny and extremely fast things.

One attosecond is equal to 1000 zeptoseconds, or 1/1000 femtosecond. Because the next SI unit is 1000 times larger, measurements of 10^{−17} and 10^{−16} second are typically expressed as tens or hundreds of attoseconds.

== Common measurements ==
- 0.247 attoseconds: travel time of a photon across "the average bond length of molecular hydrogen"
- 24.189... attoseconds: the atomic unit of time
- 43 attoseconds: the shortest pulses of laser light yet created
- 53 attoseconds: the shortest electron laser pulse ever created
- 53 attoseconds: the second-shortest pulses of laser light created
- 82 attoseconds (approximately): half-life of beryllium-8, maximum time available for the triple-alpha process for the synthesis of carbon and heavier elements in stars
- 84 attoseconds: the approximate half-life of a neutral pion
- 100 attoseconds: fastest-ever view of molecular motion
- 320 attoseconds: the estimated time it takes electrons to transfer between atoms

== Historical development ==
In 2001, Ferenc Krausz and his team at the Technical University of Vienna fired an ultrashort wavelength (7 femtoseconds) red laser pulse into a stream of neon atoms, where the stripped electrons were carried by the pulse and almost immediately re-ejected into the neon nucleus.

While capturing the attosecond pulse, the physicists also demonstrated its utility. They aimed attosecond and longer-wavelength red pulses at a type of krypton atom simultaneously: first, the electrons were knocked off; then, the red light pulse hit the electrons; finally, the energy was tested. Judging from the difference in the timing of these two pulses, the scientists obtained a very precise measurement of how long it took the electron to decay (how many attoseconds). Never before have scientists used such a short time scale to study the energy of electrons.

== Applications ==
=== Need for more precise units ===
The crystal lattice vibrates and molecules rotate on a scale of picoseconds. The creation and breaking of chemical bonds and molecular vibration happen in femtoseconds. Observing the motion of electrons happens on the attosecond scale.

The number of electrons in an atom and their configuration define an element. Because attosecond pulses are faster than the motion of electrons in atoms and molecules, attosecond provides a new tool for controlling and measuring quantum states of matter. These pulses have been used to explore the detailed physics of atoms and molecules and have potential applications in fields ranging from electronics to medicine.

=== Directly observing the wave oscillations of light ===
Using a method called attosecond streaking, people can see the electrical components of EM waves. Scientists start with a gas of neon atoms and ionize them with a single ultrashort burst of UV radiation measured in attoseconds. The electric field of the infrared can then strongly influence the motion of the electrons. The electrons will be forced up and down as the field oscillates. Depending on when the electron is released, this process will emit different final energies. The final measurement of the electron's energy, as a function of the relative delay between the two pulses, clearly shows the traces of the electric field of the attosecond pulse.

=== Short pulses of light ===
The 2023 Nobel Prize in Physics was awarded to Pierre Agostini, Ferenc Krausz, and Anne L'Huillier for demonstrating a way to create "almost unimaginably" short pulses of light, measured in attoseconds. These pulses can be used to capture and study rapid processes inside atoms, such as the behavior of electrons.

=== Control of electronic coherence and entanglement ===
Attosecond pulses have also been used to study and control quantum coherence in molecules. In a 2026 study published in Nature, researchers used synchronized attosecond and infrared laser pulses to ionize hydrogen molecules, generating entangled states between the emitted electron and the remaining molecular ion. By varying the time delay between the pulses, they demonstrated control over the degree of electronic coherence and entanglement on attosecond timescales.

== See also ==
- SI unit
- Second
- femtosecond
- picosecond
- Nanosecond
- Microsecond
- Millisecond
- Jiffy (time)
- Orders of magnitude (time)
- Attosecond chronoscopy
