= Potassium dideuterium phosphate =

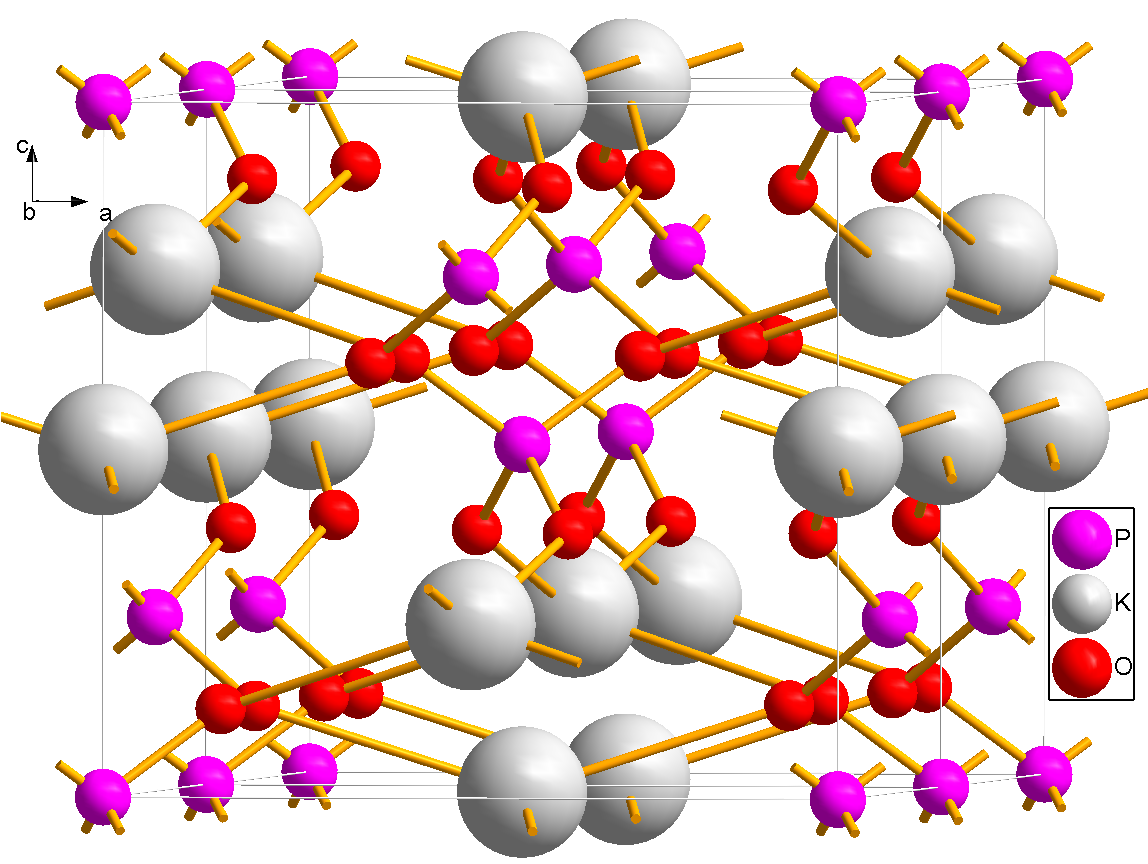
- Two unit cells of DKDP viewed close to the b axis

Names
- IUPAC names Potassium dideuterium phosphate

Identifiers
CAS Number	13761-79-0
3D model (JSmol)	Interactive image
ChemSpider	146026
EC Number	237-357-9
PubChem CID	23673711
- InChI: InChI=1S/K.H3O4P/c;1-5(2,3)4/h;(H3,1,2,3,4)/q+1;/p-1/i/hD2 Key: GNSKLFRGEWLPPA-ZSJDYOACSA-M
- SMILES: [2H]OP(=O)([O-])O[2H].[K+]

Properties
Chemical formula	KD_{2}PO_{4} or K^{2}H_{2}PO_{4}
Molar mass	138.10 g/mol
- Except where otherwise noted, data are given for materials in their standard state (at 25 °C [77 °F], 100 kPa). Infobox references

Deuterated potassium dihydrogen phosphate (KD_{2}PO_{4} or K^{2}H_{2}PO_{4}) or DKDP single crystals are widely used in non-linear optics as the second, third and fourth harmonic generators for Nd:YAG and Nd:YLF lasers. They are also found in electro-optical applications as Q-switches for Nd:YAG, Nd:YLF, alexandrite and Ti-sapphire lasers, as well as for Pockels cells.

DKDP is monopotassium phosphate (KDP, or KH_{2}PO_{4}), but using deuterium. Replacement of hydrogen by deuterium in DKDP lowers the frequency of O–H vibrations and their overtones (high-order harmonics). Absorption of light by those overtones is detrimental for the infrared lasers, which DKDP and KDP crystals are used for. Consequently, despite higher cost, DKDP is more popular than KDP.

DKDP crystals are grown by a water-solution method at usual level of deuteration >98%.

== See also ==
- Beta barium borate (BBO) – another popular non-linear crystal
- Lithium triborate (LBO) – another popular non-linear crystal
- Monopotassium phosphate (KDP) – another popular non-linear crystal
- Non-linear optics
- Potassium titanyl phosphate (KTP) – another popular non-linear crystal
- Second-harmonic generation (SHG)
- Third-harmonic generation (THG)
- Two-photon absorption (TPA)
- Organic nonlinear optical materials
