= Nd:YAB =

Yttrium aluminium borate
Identifiers
CAS Number	13813-76-8
3D model (JSmol)	Interactive image
PubChem CID	117065339
- InChI: InChI=1S/3Al.4BO3.Y/c;;;4*2-1(3)4;/q3*+3;4*-3;+3 Key: XKVPKGQXTWIKDR-UHFFFAOYSA-N; InChI=1/3Al.4BO3.Y/c;;;4*2-1(3)4;/q3*+3;4*-3;+3
- SMILES: B([O-])([O-])[O-].B([O-])([O-])[O-].B([O-])([O-])[O-].B([O-])([O-])[O-].[Al+3].[Al+3].[Al+3].[Y+3]

Properties
Chemical formula	YAl_{3}(BO_{3})_{4}

Structure
Space group	R32, No. 155
Lattice constant	a = 0.9293 nm, b = 0.9293 nm, c = 0.7245 nm
- Except where otherwise noted, data are given for materials in their standard state (at 25 °C [77 °F], 100 kPa). verify (what is ?) Infobox references

Nd:YAB (Yttrium aluminum borate, YAl_{3}(BO_{3})_{4}, hereafter referred to as YAB), is a type of frequency-doubling crystal with applications to visible laser technology. Nd:YAB most often appears as a deep purple to pink crystal, similar to amethyst.

YAB crystals are grown by the flux method with a modified molybdate flux system. They may enable diode-pumped visible-light lasers through frequency doubling of the main infrared spectral lines.
