= Liang Jingkui =

Chinese physical chemist and professor

- 梁敬魁
- Born: 28 April 1931; Fuzhou, Fujian, China
- Died: 19 January 2019 (aged 87); Beijing, China
- Education: Xiamen University, A. A. Baikov Institute of Metallurgy and Material Science
- Awards: Ho Leung Ho Lee Prize in Technological Sciences (1999)
- Scientific career
- Fields: Crystal structural chemistry Materials science Solid-state physics
- Workplaces: Institute of Physics, Chinese Academy of Sciences, Fujian Institute of Research on the Structure of Matter

Chinese name
- Chinese: 梁敬魁
Transcriptions
Standard Mandarin
- Hanyu Pinyin: Liáng Jìngkuí
- Wade–Giles: Liang Ching-k'ui
Southern Min
- Hokkien POJ: Niû Kèng-khoe

Liang Jingkui (Chinese: 梁敬魁; 28 April 1931 – 19 January 2019), also known as Jing-Kui Liang, was a Chinese physical chemist and materials scientist. He was a professor at the Institute of Physics, Chinese Academy of Sciences (CAS). He served as President of the CAS Fujian Institute of Research on the Structure of Matter from 1983 to 1987, and was elected an academician of the CAS in 1993. He was awarded the Ho Leung Ho Lee Prize in Technological Sciences in 1999 for his contributions to crystallography, solid-state physics, and materials science.

== Biography ==
Liang was born in Fuzhou, Fujian, on 28 April 1931, the son of a power plant worker at the Fuzhou Electric Company. He was able to receive an education thanks to a scholarship offered by his father's employer.

He entered Fuzhou University in 1951, and two years later transferred to Xiamen University, graduating with a bachelor's degree in physical chemistry in July 1955. He joined the Chinese Communist Party in June 1954. After studying Russian for a year, in September 1956 he was sent by the Chinese Academy of Sciences (CAS) to study in the Soviet Union at the A. A. Baikov Institute of Metallurgy and Material Science of the USSR Academy of Sciences, where he earned an associate doctor degree (equivalent to a Ph.D.) in February 1960.

He returned to China in February 1960 and became an assistant professor (researcher) at the Institute of Physics, Chinese Academy of Sciences. He was promoted to associate professor in March 1978 and professor in February 1983. From March 1984 to June 1987 he served as President of the Fujian Institute of Research on the Structure of Matter in his hometown Fuzhou. He returned to the Institute of Physics afterwards and was elected an academician of the CAS in November 1993.

On 19 January 2019, Liang died in Beijing at the age of 87.

== Scientific contributions ==
Liang made important contributions to crystallography, solid-state physics, and materials science. He designed an instrument for measuring the temperature in the instantaneous process of nuclear tests. He discovered that it is barium borate (BBO), not barium-sodium borate as previously thought, that produces the second-harmonic generation (SHG) effect. His discovery paved the way for the successful growth of BBO single crystals. He also made discoveries in technetium- and thallium-based superconductors.

Liang published over 280 scientific papers and two monographs. His works have been highly cited. He served as an editor for multiple scientific journals and trained more than 40 doctoral students and eight postdoctoral researchers.

He won multiple national scientific prizes including the State Natural Science Award and the State Science and Technology Progress Award. In 1999, he was awarded the Ho Leung Ho Lee Prize in Technological Sciences.

== See also ==
- Chen Chuangtian, discoverer of BBO
