= Second-harmonic imaging microscopy =

Microscope imaging technique

Second-harmonic imaging microscopy (SHIM) is based on a nonlinear optical effect known as second-harmonic generation (SHG). SHIM has been established as a viable microscope imaging contrast mechanism for visualization of cell and tissue structure and function. A second-harmonic microscope obtains contrasts from variations in a specimen's ability to generate second-harmonic light from the incident light while a conventional optical microscope obtains its contrast by detecting variations in optical density, path length, or refractive index of the specimen. SHG requires intense laser light passing through a material with a noncentrosymmetric molecular structure, either inherent or induced externally, for example by an electric field.

Second-harmonic light emerging from an SHG material is exactly half the wavelength (frequency doubled) of the light entering the material. While two-photon-excited fluorescence (TPEF) is also a two photon process, TPEF loses some energy during the relaxation of the excited state, while SHG is energy conserving. Typically, an inorganic crystal is used to produce SHG light such as lithium niobate (LiNbO_{3}), potassium titanyl phosphate (KTP = KTiOPO_{4}), or lithium triborate (LBO = LiB_{3}O_{5}). Though SHG requires a material to have specific molecular orientation in order for the incident light to be frequency doubled, some biological materials can be highly polarizable, and assemble into fairly ordered, large noncentrosymmetric structures. While some biological materials such as collagen, microtubules, and muscle myosin can produce SHG signals, even water can become ordered and produce second-harmonic signal under certain conditions, which allows SH microscopy to image surface potentials without any labeling molecules. The SHG pattern is mainly determined by the phase matching condition. A common setup for an SHG imaging system will have a laser scanning microscope with a titanium sapphire mode-locked laser as the excitation source. The SHG signal is propagated in the forward direction. However, some experiments have shown that objects on the order of about a tenth of the wavelength of the SHG produced signal will produce nearly equal forward and backward signals.

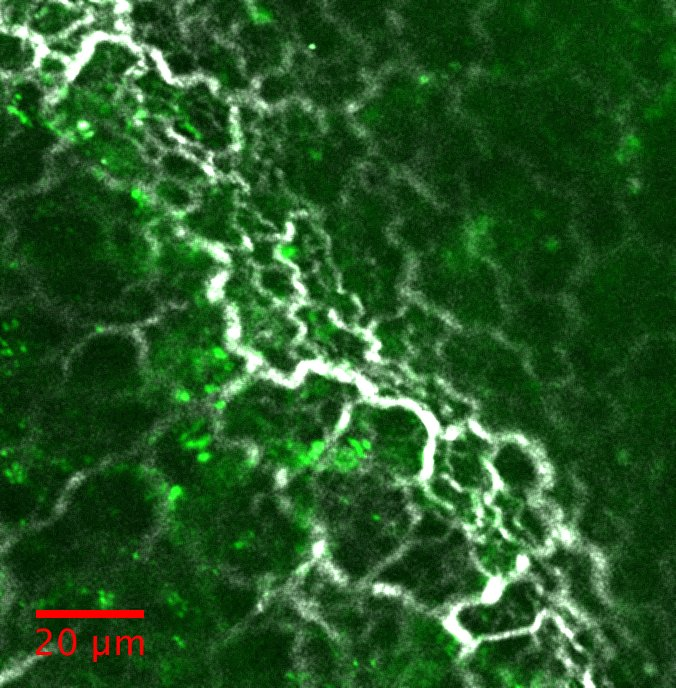
Second-harmonic image of collagen (shown in white) in liver

== Advantages ==
SHIM offers several advantages for live cell and tissue imaging. SHG does not involve the excitation of molecules like other techniques such as fluorescence microscopy therefore, the molecules shouldn't suffer the effects of phototoxicity or photobleaching. Also, since many biological structures produce strong SHG signals, the labeling of molecules with exogenous probes is not required which can also alter the way a biological system functions. By using near infrared wavelengths for the incident light, SHIM has the ability to construct three-dimensional images of specimens by imaging deeper into thick tissues.

=== Difference and complementarity with two-photon fluorescence (2PEF) ===
Two-photons fluorescence (2PEF) is a very different process from SHG: it involves excitation of electrons to higher energy levels, and subsequent de-excitation by photon emission (unlike SHG, although it is also a 2-photon process). Thus, 2PEF is a non coherent process, spatially (emitted isotropically) and temporally (broad, sample-dependent spectrum). It is also not specific to certain structure, unlike SHG.

It can therefore be coupled to SHG in multiphoton imaging to reveal some molecules that do produce autofluorescence, like elastin in tissues (while SHG reveals collagen or myosin for instance).

== History ==
Before SHG was used for imaging, the first demonstration of SHG was performed in 1961 by P. A. Franken, G. Weinreich, C. W. Peters, and A. E. Hill at the University of Michigan, Ann Arbor using a quartz sample. In 1968, SHG from interfaces was discovered by Bloembergen and has since been used as a tool for characterizing surfaces and probing interface dynamics. In 1971, Fine and Hansen reported the first observation of SHG from biological tissue samples. In 1974, Robert W. Hellwarth and Christensen first reported the integration of SHG and microscopy by imaging SHG signals from polycrystalline ZnSe. In 1977, Colin Sheppard imaged various SHG crystals with a scanning optical microscope. The first biological imaging experiments were done by Freund and Deutsch in 1986 to study the orientation of collagen fibers in rat tail tendon. In 1993, Lewis examined the second-harmonic response of styryl dyes in electric fields. He also showed work on imaging live cells. In 2006, Goro Mizutani group developed a non-scanning SHG microscope that significantly shortens the time required for observation of large samples, even if the two-photons wide-field microscope was published in 1996 and could have been used to detect SHG. The non-scanning SHG microscope was used for observation of plant starch, megamolecule, spider silk and so on. In 2010 SHG was extended to whole-animal in vivo imaging. In 2019, SHG applications widened when it was applied to the use of selectively imaging agrochemicals directly on leaf surfaces to provide a way to evaluate the effectiveness of pesticides.

== Quantitative measurements ==
=== Orientational anisotropy ===
SHG polarization anisotropy can be used to determine the orientation and degree of organization of proteins in tissues since SHG signals have well-defined polarizations. By using the anisotropy equation:

$\frac{I_{par}-I_{perp}}{I_{par}+2I_{perp}}=r$

and acquiring the intensities of the polarizations in the parallel and perpendicular directions. A high $r$ value indicates an anisotropic orientation whereas a low $r$ value indicates an isotropic structure. In work done by Campagnola and Loew, it was found that collagen fibers formed well-aligned structures with an $r=0.7$ value.

=== Forward over backward SHG ===
SHG being a coherent process (spatially and temporally), it keeps information on the direction of the excitation and is not emitted isotropically. It is mainly emitted in forward direction (same as excitation), but can also be emitted in backward direction depending on the phase-matching condition. Indeed, the coherence length beyond which the conversion of the signal decreases is:

$l_c = 2/\Delta k$

with $\Delta k \propto 1/(n_{2\omega}-n_{\omega})$ for forward, but $\Delta k_{bwd} \propto 1/(n_{2\omega}+n_{\omega})$ for backward such that $l_c$ >> $l_{c,bwd}$. Therefore, thicker structures will appear preferentially in forward, and thinner ones in backward: since the SHG conversion depends at first approximation on the square of the number of nonlinear converters, the signal will be higher if emitted by thick structures, thus the signal in forward direction will be higher than in backward. However, the tissue can scatter the generated light, and a part of the SHG in forward can be retro-reflected in the backward direction. Then, the forward-over-backward ratio F/B can be calculated, and is a metric of the global size and arrangement of the SHG converters (usually collagen fibrils). It can also be shown that the higher the out-of-plane angle of the scatterer, the higher its F/B ratio (see fig. 2.14 of).

=== Polarization-resolved SHG ===
The advantages of polarimetry were coupled to SHG in 2002 by Stoller et al. Polarimetry can measure the orientation and order at molecular level, and coupled to SHG it can do so with the specificity to certain structures like collagen: polarization-resolved SHG microscopy (p-SHG) is thus an expansion of SHG microscopy. p-SHG defines another anisotropy parameter, as:

$\rho = \sqrt{\frac{I_{par}}{I_{perp}}}$

which is, like r, a measure of the principal orientation and disorder of the structure being imaged. Since it is often performed in long cylindrical filaments (like collagen), this anisotropy is often equal to $\rho = \frac{\chi^{(2)}_{XXX}}{\chi^{(2)}_{XYY}}$ , where $\chi^{(2)}$ is the nonlinear susceptibility tensor and X the direction of the filament (or main direction of the structure), Y orthogonal to X and Z the propagation of the excitation light. The orientation ϕ of the filaments in the plane XY of the image can also be extracted from p-SHG by FFT analysis, and put in a map.

=== Fibrosis quantization ===
Collagen (particular case, but widely studied in SHG microscopy), can exist in various forms : 28 different types, of which 5 are fibrillar. One of the challenge is to determine and quantify the amount of fibrillar collagen in a tissue, to be able to see its evolution and relationship with other non-collagenous materials.

To that end, a SHG microscopy image has to be corrected to remove the small amount of residual fluorescence or noise that exist at the SHG wavelength. After that, a mask can be applied to quantify the collagen inside the image. Among other quantization techniques, it is probably the one with the highest specificity, reproductibility and applicability despite being quite complex.

=== Others ===
It has also been used to prove that backpropagating action potentials invade dendritic spines without voltage attenuation, establishing a sound basis for future work on Long-term potentiation. Its use here was that it provided a way to accurately measure the voltage in the tiny dendritic spines with an accuracy unattainable with standard two-photon microscopy. Meanwhile, SHG can efficiently convert near-infrared light to visible light to enable imaging-guided photodynamic therapy, overcoming the penetration depth limitations.

== Materials that can be imaged ==
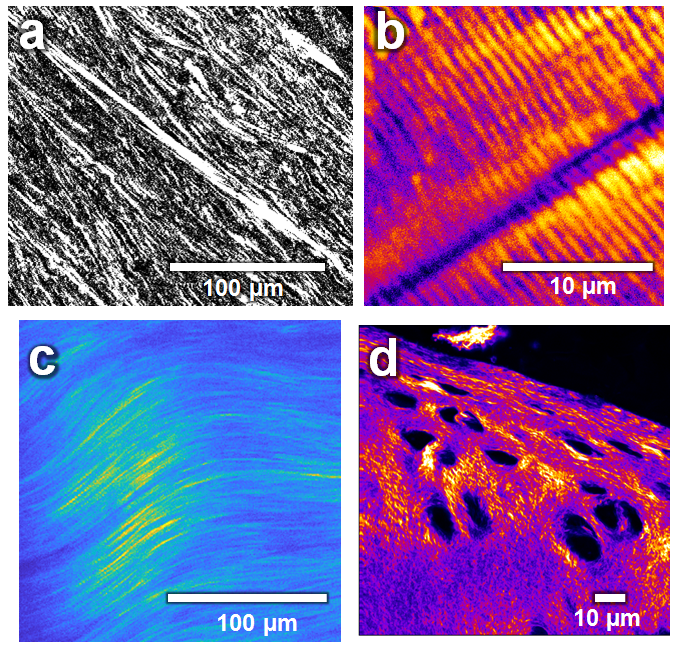
Biological tissues imaged by second-harmonic generation (SHG) microscopy. (a) Transverse cut of a human cornea. (b) Skeletal muscle from zebrafish (myosin). (c) Adult mice-tail tendon. (d) Surface cartilage from a knee of a mature horse.

SHG microscopy and its expansions can be used to study various tissues: some example images are reported in the figure below: collagen inside the extracellular matrix remains the main application. It can be found in tendon, skin, bone, cornea, aorta, fascia, cartilage, meniscus, intervertebral disks...

Myosin can also be imaged in skeletal muscle or cardiac muscle.

Table 1: Materials visible by or that efficiently generate SHG.
Type	Material	Found in	SHG signal	Specificity
Carbohydrate	Cellulose	Wood, green plant, algae.	Quite weak in normal cellulose, but substantial in crystalline or nanocrystalline cellulose.	-
Carbohydrate	Starch	Staple foods, green plant	Quite intense signal	chirality is at micro and macro level, and the SHG is different under right or left-handed circular polarization
Carbohydrate	Megamolecular polysaccharide sacran	Cyanobactery	From sacran cotton-like lump, fibers, and cast films	signal from films is weaker
Protein	Fibroin and sericin	Spider silk	Quite weak	
Protein	Collagen	tendon, skin, bone, cornea, aorta, fascia, cartilage, meniscus, intervertebral disks; connective tissues	Quite strong, depends on the type of the collagen (does it form fibrils, fibers ?)	nonlinear susceptibility tensor components are $d_{33}$, $d_{31}$, $d_{15}$, with $d_{31}$ ~ $d_{15}$ and $d_{33}$/$d_{15}$ ~ 1.4 in most cases
Protein	Myosin	Skeletal or cardiac muscle	Quite strong	nonlinear susceptibility tensor components are $d_{33}$, $d_{31}$, $d_{15}$ with $d_{31}$ ~ $d_{15}$ but $d_{33}$/$d_{15}$ ~ 0.6 < 1 contrary to collagen
Protein	Tubulin	Microtubules in mitosis or meiosis, or in neurites (mainly axons)	Quite weak	The microtubules have to be aligned to efficiently generate
Minerals	Piezoelectric crystals	Also called nonlinear crystals	Strong if phase-matched	Different types of phase-matching, critical of non-critical
Polar liquids	Water	Most living organisms	Barely detectable (requires wide-field geometry and ultra-short laser pulses)	Directly probing electrostatic fields, since oriented water molecules satisfy phase-matching condition

== Coupling with THG microscopy ==
Third-Harmonic Generation (THG) microscopy can be complementary to SHG microscopy, as it is sensitive to the transverse interfaces, and to the 3rd order nonlinear susceptibility $\chi^{(3)}$

== Applications ==
=== Cancer progression, tumor characterization ===
The mammographic density is correlated with the collagen density, thus SHG can be used for identifying breast cancer. SHG is usually coupled to other nonlinear techniques such as Coherent anti-Stokes Raman Scattering or Two-photon excitation microscopy, as part of a routine called multiphoton microscopy (or tomography) that provides a non-invasive and rapid in vivo histology of biopsies that may be cancerous.

==== Breast cancer ====
The comparison of forward and backward SHG images gives insight about the microstructure of collagen, itself related to the grade and stage of a tumor, and its progression in breast. Comparison of SHG and 2PEF can also show the change of collagen orientation in tumors. Even if SHG microscopy has contributed a lot to breast cancer research, it is not yet established as a reliable technique in hospitals, or for diagnostic of this pathology in general.

==== Ovarian cancer ====
Healthy ovaries present in SHG a uniform epithelial layer and well-organized collagen in their stroma, whereas abnormal ones show an epithelium with large cells and a changed collagen structure. The r ratio is also used to show that the alignment of fibrils is slightly higher for cancerous than for normal tissues.

==== Skin cancer ====
SHG is, again, combined to 2PEF is used to calculate the ratio:

$MFSI=(\text{shg}-\text{tpef})/(\text{shg}+\text{tpef})$

where shg (resp. tpef) is the number of thresholded pixels in the SHG (resp. 2PEF) image, a high MFSI meaning a pure SHG image (with no fluorescence). The highest MFSI is found in cancerous tissues, which provides a contrast mode to differentiate from normal tissues.

SHG was also combined to Third-Harmonic Generation (THG) to show that backward THG is higher in tumors.

==== Pancreatic cancer ====
Changes in collagen ultrastructure in pancreatic cancer can be investigated by multiphoton fluorescence and polarization-resolved SHIM.

==== Other cancers ====
SHG microscopy was reported for the study of lung, colonic, esophageal stroma and cervical cancers.

=== Pathologies detection ===
Alterations in the organization or polarity of the collagen fibrils can be signs of pathology,.

In particular, the anisotropic alignment of collagen fibers allowed the discrimination of healthy dermis from pathological scars in skin. Also, pathologies in cartilage such as osteoarthritis can be probed by polarization-resolved SHG microscopy,. SHIM was later extended to fibro-cartilage (meniscus).

=== Tissue engineering ===
The ability of SHG to image specific molecules can reveal the structure of a certain tissue one material at a time, and at various scales (from macro to micro) using microscopy. For instance, the collagen (type I) is specifically imaged from the extracellular matrix (ECM) of cells, or when it serves as a scaffold or conjonctive material in tissues. SHG also reveals fibroin in silk, myosin in muscles and biosynthetized cellulose. All of this imaging capability can be used to design artificials tissues, by targeting specific points of the tissue : SHG can indeed quantitatively measure some orientations, and material quantity and arrangement. Also, SHG coupled to other multiphoton techniques can serve to monitor the development of engineered tissues, when the sample is relatively thin however. Of course, they can finally be used as a quality control of the fabricated tissues.

=== Structure of the eye ===
Cornea, at the surface of the eye, is considered to be made of plywood-like structure of collagen, due to the self-organization properties of sufficiently dense collagen. Yet, the collagenous orientation in lamellae is still under debate in this tissue. Keratoconus cornea can also be imaged by SHG to reveal morphological alterations of the collagen. Third-Harmonic Generation (THG) microscopy is moreover used to image the cornea, which is complementary to SHG signal as THG and SHG maxima in this tissue are often at different places.

== See also ==
- Nonlinear optics
- Second-harmonic generation
- Two-photon excitation microscopy

== Sources ==
- Schmitt, Michael; Mayerhöfer, Thomas; Popp, Jürgen; Kleppe, Ingo; Weisshartannée, Klaus (2013). Handbook of Biophotonics, Chap.3 Light–Matter Interaction. Wiley. doi:10.1002/9783527643981.bphot003. ISBN 978-3-527-64398-1. S2CID 93908151.
- Pavone, Francesco S.; Campagnola, Paul J. (2016). Second Harmonic Generation Imaging, 2nd edition. CRC Taylor&Francis. ISBN 978-1-4398-4914-9.
- Campagnola, Paul J.; Clark, Heather A.; Mohler, William A.; Lewis, Aaron; Loew, Leslie M. (2001). "Second harmonic imaging microscopy of living cells" (PDF). Journal of Biomedical Optics. 6 (3): 277–286. Bibcode:2001JBO.....6..277C. doi:10.1117/1.1383294. hdl:2047/d20000323. PMID 11516317. S2CID 2376695.
- Campagnola, Paul J.; Loew, Leslie M (2003). "Second-harmonic imaging microscopy for visualizing biomolecular arrays in cells, tissues and organisms" (PDF). Nature Biotechnology. 21 (11): 1356–1360. doi:10.1038/nbt894. PMID 14595363. S2CID 18701570. Archived from the original (PDF) on 2016-03-04.
- Stoller, P.; Reiser, K.M.; Celliers, P.M.; Rubenchik, A.M. (2002). "Polarization-modulated second harmonic generation in collagen". Biophys. J. 82 (6): 3330–3342. Bibcode:2002BpJ....82.3330S. doi:10.1016/s0006-3495(02)75673-7. PMC 1302120. PMID 12023255.
- Han, M.; Giese, G.; Bille, J. F. (2005). "Second harmonic generation imaging of collagen fibrils in cornea and sclera". Opt. Express. 13 (15): 5791–5797. Bibcode:2005OExpr..13.5791H. doi:10.1364/opex.13.005791. PMID 19498583.
- König, Karsten (2018). Multiphoton Microscopy and Fluorescence Lifetime Imaging - Applications in Biology and Medicine. De Gruyter. ISBN 978-3-11-042998-5.
- Keikhosravi, Adib; Bredfeldt, Jeremy S.; Sagar, Abdul Kader; Eliceiri, Kevin W. (2014). "Second-harmonic generation imaging of cancer". Quantitative Imaging in Cell Biology. Methods in Cell Biology. Vol. 123. pp. 531–546. doi:10.1016/B978-0-12-420138-5.00028-8. ISBN 978-0-12-420138-5. ISSN 0091-679X. PMID 24974046.
- Hanry Yu; Nur Aida Abdul Rahim (2013). Imaging in Cellular and Tissue Engineering, 1st edition. CRC Taylor&Francis. ISBN 978-0-367-44586-7.
- Cicchi, Riccardo; Vogler, Nadine; Kapsokalyvas, Dimitrios; Dietzek, Benjamin; Popp, Jürgen; Pavone, Francesco Saverio (2013). "From molecular structure to tissue architecture: collagen organization probed by SHG microscopy". Journal of Biophotonics. 6 (2): 129–142. doi:10.1002/jbio.201200092. PMID 22791562.
- Roesel, D.; Eremchev, M.; Schönfeldová, T.; Lee, S.; Roke, S. (2022-04-18). "Water as a contrast agent to quantify surface chemistry and physics using second harmonic scattering and imaging: A perspective". Applied Physics Letters. 120 (16). AIP Publishing: 160501. Bibcode:2022ApPhL.120p0501R. doi:10.1063/5.0085807. ISSN 0003-6951. S2CID 248252664.
