= Latex foam =

Latex foam may refer to:

- Foam latex, a lightweight form of latex created from liquid latex
- Foam rubber, rubber that has been manufactured with a foaming agent to create an air-filled matrix structure

== See also ==
- Foam
- Latex
