= Pockels effect =

Linear change in the refractive index of optical media due to an electric field

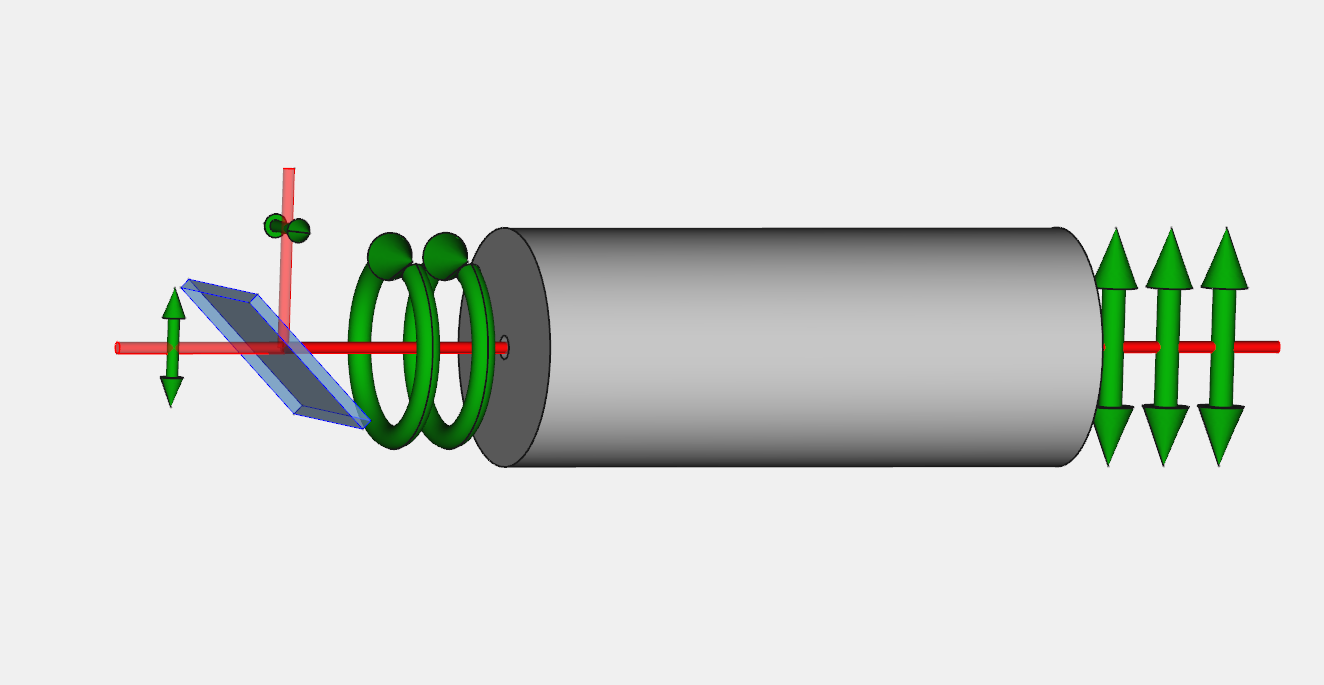
A schematic of a Pockels cell modulating the polarization of light. In this case, the Pockels cell is acting as a quarter wave plate, where linearly-polarized light is converted to circularly-polarized light. With the addition of a Brewster window (left), this change in polarization can be converted to a change in the intensity of the beam, by transmitting only the p-polarized vector component.

In optics, the Pockels effect, or Pockels electro-optic effect, is a directionally-dependent linear variation in the refractive index of an optical medium that occurs in response to the application of an electric field. It is named after the German physicist Friedrich Carl Alwin Pockels, who studied the effect in 1893. The non-linear counterpart, the Kerr effect, causes changes in the refractive index at a rate proportional to the square of the applied electric field. In optical media, the Pockels effect causes changes in birefringence that vary in proportion to the strength of the applied electric field.

The Pockels effect occurs in crystals that lack inversion symmetry, such as monopotassium phosphate (KH_{2}PO_{4}, abbr. KDP), potassium dideuterium phosphate (KD_{2}PO_{4}, abbr. KD*P or DKDP), lithium niobate (LiNbO_{3}), beta-barium borate (BBO), barium titanate (BTO) and in other non-centrosymmetric media such as electric-field poled polymers or glasses. The Pockels effect has been elucidated through extensive study of electro-optic properties in materials like KDP.

== Pockels cells ==
The key component of a Pockels cell is a non-centrosymmetric single crystal with an optic axis whose refractive index is controlled by an external electric field. In other words, the Pockels effect is the basis of the operation of Pockels cells. By controlling the refractive index, the optical retardance of the crystal is altered so the polarization state of incident light beam is changed. Therefore, Pockels cells are used as voltage-controlled wave plates as well as other photonics applications. See applications below for uses. Pockels cells are divided into two configurations depending on the crystals' electro-optic properties: longitudinal and transverse.

Longitudinal Pockels cells operate with electric field applied along the crystal optic axis or along incident beam propagation. Such crystals include KDP, KD*P, and ADP. Electrodes are coated as transparent metal oxide films on crystal faces where the beam is propagating through or metal rings (usually made out of gold) coated around the crystal body. Terminals for voltage application are in contact with the electrodes. The optical retardance Δφ for longitudinal Pockels cells proportional to the ordinary refractive index n_{o}, electro-optic constant r_{63} (units of m/V), and applied voltage V and inversely proportional to the incident beam wavelength λ_{0}. For an example, the halfwave voltage is approximately 7.6 kV for a KDP crystal with a n_{o} = 1.51, r_{63} = 10.6×10^{−12} m/V at λ_{0}, and Δφ = π. The advantage of using longitudinal Pockels cells is that the voltage requirements for quarter wave or half wave retardance is not dependent on crystal length or diameter.

Transverse Pockels cells operate with electric field being applied perpendicular to beam propagation. Crystals used in transverse Pockels cells include BBO, LiNbO_{3}, CdTe, ZnSe, and CdSe. The long sides of the crystal are coated with electrodes. Optical retardance Δφ for transverse Pockels cells is similar to that of longitudinal Pockels cells but it is dependent on crystal dimensions. The quarter wave or half wave voltage requirements increase with crystal aperture size, but the requirements can be reduced by lengthening the crystal.

Two or more crystal can be incorporated into a transverse Pockels cell. One reason is to reduce the voltage requirement by extending the overall length of the Pockels cell. Another reason is the fact that KDP is biaxial and possesses two electro-optic constants, r_{63} for longitudinal configuration and r_{41} for transverse configuration. A transverse Pockels cell that uses a KDP (or one of its isomorphs) consists of two crystals in opposite orientation, which together give a zero-order waveplate when the voltage is turned off. This is often not perfect and drifts with temperature. But the mechanical alignment of the crystal axis is not so critical and is often done by hand without screws; while misalignment leads to some energy in the wrong ray (either e or o – for example, horizontal or vertical), in contrast to the longitudinal case, the loss is not amplified through the length of the crystal.

Alignment of the crystal axis with the ray axis is critical, regardless of configuration. Misalignment leads to birefringence and to a large phase shift across the long crystal. This leads to polarization rotation if the alignment is not exactly parallel or perpendicular to the polarization.

=== Dynamics within the cell ===
Because of the high relative dielectric constant of ε_{r} ≈ 36 inside the crystal, changes in the electric field propagate at a speed of only c/6. Fast non-fiber optic cells are thus embedded into a matched transmission line. Putting it at the end of a transmission line leads to reflections and doubled switching time. The signal from the driver is split into parallel lines that lead to both ends of the crystal. When they meet in the crystal, their voltages add up. Pockels cells for fiber optics may employ a traveling wave design to reduce current requirements and increase speed.

Usable crystals also exhibit the piezoelectric effect to some degree (RTP (RbTiOPO_{4}) has the lowest, BBO and lithium niobate are the highest). After a voltage change, sound waves start propagating from the sides of the crystal to the middle. This is important not for pulse pickers, but for boxcar windows. Guard space between the light and the faces of the crystals needs to be larger for longer holding times. Behind the sound wave the crystal stays deformed in the equilibrium position for the high electric field. This increases the polarization. Due to the growing of the polarized volume the electric field in the crystal in front of the wave increases linearly, or the driver has to provide a constant current leakage.

=== The driver electronics ===
A Pockels cell, by design, is a capacitor, and often require high voltages to change the state of the polarization of the laser beam to effectively operate as a switchable waveplate. The voltage required depends on the type of Pockels cell, the wavelength of the light, and the size of the crystal; but typically, the voltage range is in the order of 1–10 kV. Pockels cell drivers provide this high voltage in the form of very fast pulses, which typically have rise times of less than 10 nanoseconds.

There are basically two types of drivers: a quick or Q drive which has a fast rise time, then slowly decays. A Pockels cell that uses a Q-drive is sometimes referred to as a Q-switch. The other type of driver is referred to as a regenerative or R drive. R drives will have a fast rise time and a fast fall time. The driver's output pulse width can be from nanoseconds to microseconds long, depending on the application. The type of drive and its repetition rate will depend on the laser and the intended application.

=== Applications ===
Pockels cells are used in a variety of scientific and technical applications. A Pockels cell, combined with a polarizer, can be used for switching between initial polarization state and half-wave phase retardance, creating a fast shutter capable of "opening" and "closing" in nanoseconds. The same technique can be used to impress information on the beam by modulating the rotation between 0° and 90°; the exiting beam's intensity, when viewed through the polarizer, contains an amplitude-modulated signal. This modulated signal can be used for time-resolved electric field measurements when a crystal is exposed to an unknown electric field.

Pockels cells are used as a Q-switch to generate short, high-intensity laser pulse. The Pockels cell prevents optical amplification by introducing a polarization dependent loss in the laser cavity. This allows the gain medium to have a high population inversion. When the gain medium has the desired population inversion, the Pockels cell is switched "open", and a short high energy laser pulse is created. Q-switched lasers are used in a variety of applications, such as medical aesthetics, metrology, manufacturing, and holography.

Pulse picking is another application that uses a Pockels cell. A pulse picker is typically composed of an oscillator, electro-optic modulator, amplifiers, high voltage driver, and a frequency doubling modulator along with a Pockels cell. The Pockels cell can pick up a pulse from a laser induced bunch while blocking the rest by synchronized electro-optic switching.

Pockels cells are also used in regenerative amplifiers, chirped pulse amplification, and cavity dumping to let optical power in and out of lasers and optical amplifiers.

Pockels cells can be used for quantum key distribution by polarizing photons.

Pockels cells in conjunction with other EO elements can be combined to form electro-optic probes.

Pockels cells are used in two-photon microscopy to adjust the transmitted laser intensity at a time scale of microseconds.

In recent years, Pockels cells are employed at the National Ignition Facility located at Lawrence Livermore National Laboratory. Each Pockels cell for one of the 192 lasers acts as an optical trap before exiting through an amplifier. The beams from all of the 192 lasers eventually converge onto a single target of deuterium-tritium fuel in hopes to trigger a fusion reaction.

== Pockels imaging ==
The Pockels effect has long been used to map the electric field distribution in semiconductor radiation detectors, typically revealing slowly varying or quasi-stationary space-charge distributions under bias and illumination. These approaches, however, resolve field changes on time scales ranging from milliseconds to tens of minutes and do not access the motion of free carriers. For this reason, in detector characterization Pockels-based methods have so far been used mainly to monitor space-charge or quasi-steady charge phenomena. In 2026, Pockels imaging was extended to the nanosecond regime, allowing photogenerated electron clouds to be visualized directly in an operating CdTe detector with micrometre spatial and nanosecond temporal resolution, and the displacement current and moving charge distribution to be reconstructed.

== See also ==
- Electro-optic modulator
- Acousto-optic modulator
- Kerr effect
