= Chen Chuangtian =

Chinese chemist (1937–2018)

- 陈创天
- Born: 18 February 1937; Fenghua, Zhejiang, China
- Died: 31 October 2018 (aged 81); Beijing, China
- Education: Peking University
- Known for: Discovery of BBO, LBO and KBBF
- Awards: CAS Science and Technology Progress Award (1986); TWAS Prize in Chemistry (1987); State Technological Invention Award, First Class (1991); Laudise Prize (2013)
- Scientific career
- Fields: Materials science, physical chemistry
- Workplaces: Fujian Institute of Research on the Structure of Matter
- Academic advisors: Lu Jiaxi

Chinese name
- Traditional Chinese: 陳創天
- Simplified Chinese: 陈创天
Transcriptions
Standard Mandarin
- Hanyu Pinyin: Chén Chuàngtiān
- Wade–Giles: Ch'ên^{2} Ch'uang^{4}-t'ien^{1}
Wu
- Romanization: Zen^{3} Tshaan^{2} Thi^{1}

Chen Chuangtian (Chinese: 陈创天; 18 February 1937 – 31 October 2018), also known as Chuang-Tian Chen, was a Chinese materials scientist and physical chemist who specialized in crystals used in lasers. He discovered the nonlinear optical crystals BBO, LBO and KBBF, which have important uses in areas including superconductor research, semiconductor photolithography, and the medical industry. He was an academician of the Chinese Academy of Sciences and a fellow of The World Academy of Sciences. He was awarded the TWAS Prize in Chemistry, the State Technological Invention Award (First Class), and the Laudise Prize.

== Biography ==
Chen was born on 18 February 1937 in Fenghua, Zhejiang, China. He studied at Shenyang No. 2 High School, and was accepted by the Department of Physics of Peking University in August 1956. After graduating in 1962, he entered the Fujian Institute of Research on the Structure of Matter in Fuzhou on the recommendation of Hu Ning, and studied under physical chemist Lu Jiaxi for three years.

In 1965, Chen chose nonlinear optical materials as his research direction and spent the next two years calculating the nonlinear optical coefficients of many crystals. In the late 1970s and the 1980s, Chen and his team discovered the new nonlinear optical crystals BaB_{2}O_{4} (BBO) and LiB_{3}O_{5} (LBO).

In 1988, Chen and his team began searching for optical compounds that could produce shorter ultraviolet wavelengths. After researching hundreds of compounds, they discovered potassium beryllium fluoroborate (KBBF), a nonlinear optical crystal which is capable of generating light within a very narrow bandwidth, with wavelengths of less than 200 nanometers. The crystal is important in superconductor research and can allow the replacement of excimer laser with solid-state ones in photolithography used in the semiconductor and the medical industries. Until at least 2009, Chen's laboratory at the Fujian Institute of Research on the Structure of Matter was the only place in the world that could produce KBBF. In 2013, Chen and his colleague Xu Zuyan invented the DUV-DPL device (deep ultraviolet diode-pumped solid-state laser), with a wavelength of only 177.3 nm.

Chen died on 31 October 2018 in Beijing, at the age of 81.

== Honors and recognition ==
Chen was elected a fellow of The World Academy of Sciences in 1990 and an academician of the Chinese Academy of Sciences in 2003.

Chen was awarded the 1987 TWAS Prize in Chemistry, "for his outstanding contribution to the development of new nonlinear optical materials, the formulation of a quantum chemical theory that guides the search for such materials and the discovery of beta barium borate and lithium triborate". He won a Special Prize of the Science and Technology Progress Award of the Chinese Academy of Sciences in 1986 for his discovery of BBO and the State Technological Invention Award (First Class) in 1991 for LBO. In 2013, he was awarded the Laudise Prize by the International Organization for Crystal Growth.

== See also ==
- Liang Jingkui
