= Foam latex =

Form of latex containing bubbles

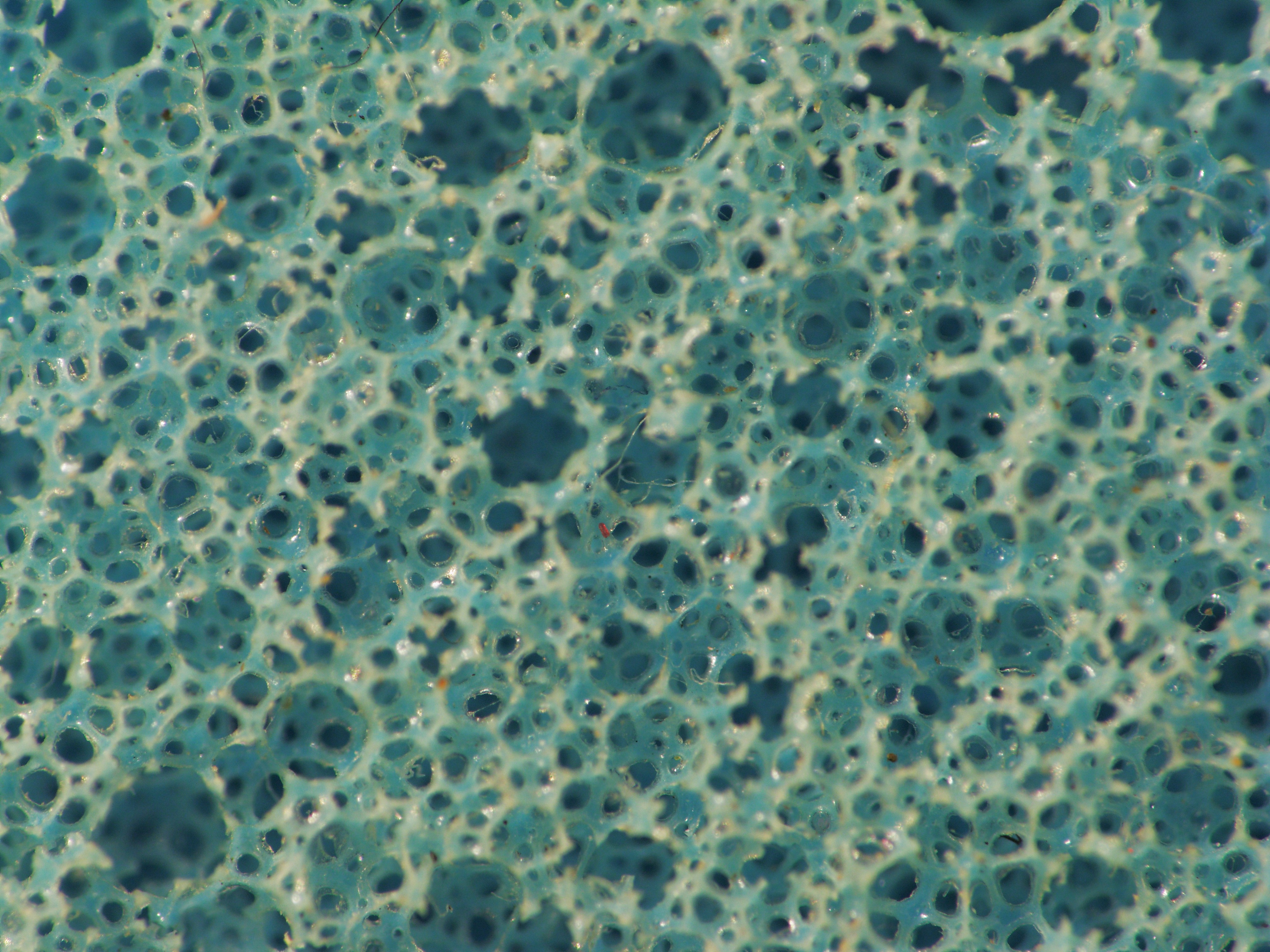
Image of the bubbles in a foamed plastic.

Foam latex or latex foam rubber is a lightweight form of latex containing bubbles known as cells, created from liquid latex. The foam is generally created though the Dunlop or Talalay process in which a liquid latex is foamed and then cured in a mold to extract the foam.

Structural enhancements are applied to a foam by making different choices of polymers used for the foam or through the use of fillers in the foam. Historically, natural rubber latex is used for the foam, but a similar commercial contender is styrene-butadiene latex, which is especially designed for use in latex foams. Mineral fillers may also be used for the enhancement of properties like stability, load bearing, or flame resistance, but these fillers often come at the cost of lowered tensile strength and extension at break, which are generally desirable properties in the product.

Latex foam has properties of energy absorption, thermal conductivity, and compression that make them suitable for many commercial applications like upholstery, soundproofing, thermal insulation (especially in construction), and transportation of goods.

Foam latex is also used in masks and facial prosthetics to change a person's outward appearance. The Wizard of Oz was one of the first films to make extensive use of foam latex prosthetics in the 1930s. Since then, it has been a staple of film, television, and stage productions, in addition to use in a number of other fields.

Single use plastics and polymer foams are often disposed of in landfills, and there is a growing concern about the amount of space this waste takes up. In an effort to make the foams more environmentally friendly, research is being done into fillers than can achieve the same enhancements as mineral while also increasing biodegradability of the product. Examples of such fillers include eggshell powders and rice husk powders.

== Structure ==
Latex foam is a form of latex that is lightweight and expanded. Cellular air bubbles are created inside liquid latex, and they can be shaped into different shapes and sizes. The extension of the foam is defined by the amount of air inside of these cells. Lower density and more extended foams tend to have cells which are more polyhedral, while less extended foams tend to have more spherical cells.

While the density of the foam ($\rho_f$) can be measured, a more important property is relative density of the foam to the density of the original latex base ($\rho_s$). This is expressed as $\phi=\dfrac{\rho_f}{\rho_s}$. Polymer foams will also have some ratio of closed cells to open cells (air bubbles which have been burst open), which can be measured through the water permeability of the foam.

== Creation ==
To create foam latex, a liquid latex base is mixed with various additives and whipped into a foam, then poured or injected into a mold and baked in an oven to cure. The main components of foam latex are the latex base, a foaming agent (to help it whip into a froth), a gelling agent (to convert the liquid foam into a gel), and a curing agent (to turn the gelled foam latex into a solid when baked). A number of additional additives can also be added depending on the required use of the foam.

=== Dunlop process ===
The Dunlop process can be performed in batch form and in a continuous form. The following is a description for the batch process.

1. Different ingredients for the latex foam are prepared, including the choice of liquid latex, compounding agents, and stabilizers, are prepared for usage.
2. Deammoniated liquid latex is mixed with stabilizer and other ingredients, either as dispersions or emulsions depending on solubility in water.
3. The compound is gently stirred and allowed to mix. Fillers may be added at this point. The compound may be left to mature for 24 hours.
4. A Hobart mixer whips the compound to cause it to foam, incorporating differently sized bubbles into it and allowing it to expand to a desired size.
5. The whipping speed is reduced, and the bubbles assume a more regular size. A foam stabilizer can be added now.
6. A gelling agent can be added next, and then the compound is poured into a mold where it is allowed to gel and cure over time.

Uniformity is a highly sought after property commercially, and performing the Dunlop process in a continuous manner rather than in batches helps increase the uniformity of the produced foams. Other advantages of the continuous process is the decreased labor cost and lowered waste product from the mold. The continuous process includes the use of a machine with different chambers for the creation and foaming of the mixture, addition of fillers, and molding and curing.

=== Talalay process ===
1. Different ingredients for the latex foam are prepared, including the choice of liquid latex, compounding agents, and stabilizers, are prepared for usage.
2. Deammoniated liquid latex is mixed with stabilizer and other ingredients, either as dispersions or emulsions depending on solubility in water.
3. The compound is gently stirred and allowed to mix. Fillers may be added at this point. The compound may be left to mature for 24 hours.
4. Through decomposition of hydrogen peroxide by yeast, bubbles are created which cause the foaming of the compound inside of the specialized mold.
5. A vacuum is applied to the mold to promote expansion.
6. The compound is then quickly frozen to create air bubbles.
7. Finally, the compound is allowed to cure and removed from the mold.

The disuse of a gelling agent in preference for carbon dioxide makes the process more environmentally friendly, but the Talalay process is still not widely used for specialized latex foams industrially.

== Properties ==
=== Expansion and density ===
In general, latex foams have lower density than the original polymer they are made of. This density can be measured regularly by taking a volume and mass measurement of the material. For a volume measurement of irregularly shaped foam, the foam pieces can be coated with wax and inserted in a known volume of water to measure volume change in the container. The purpose of the wax is to prevent water permeation into the foam, which may lead to a lower perceived volume (and higher perceived density as a result) if not accounted for. The density of a foam decreases as the expansion of the foam increases. Expansion, in turn, relates to the amount of air inside the cells of the foam. The more air inside the cells, the larger the expansion.

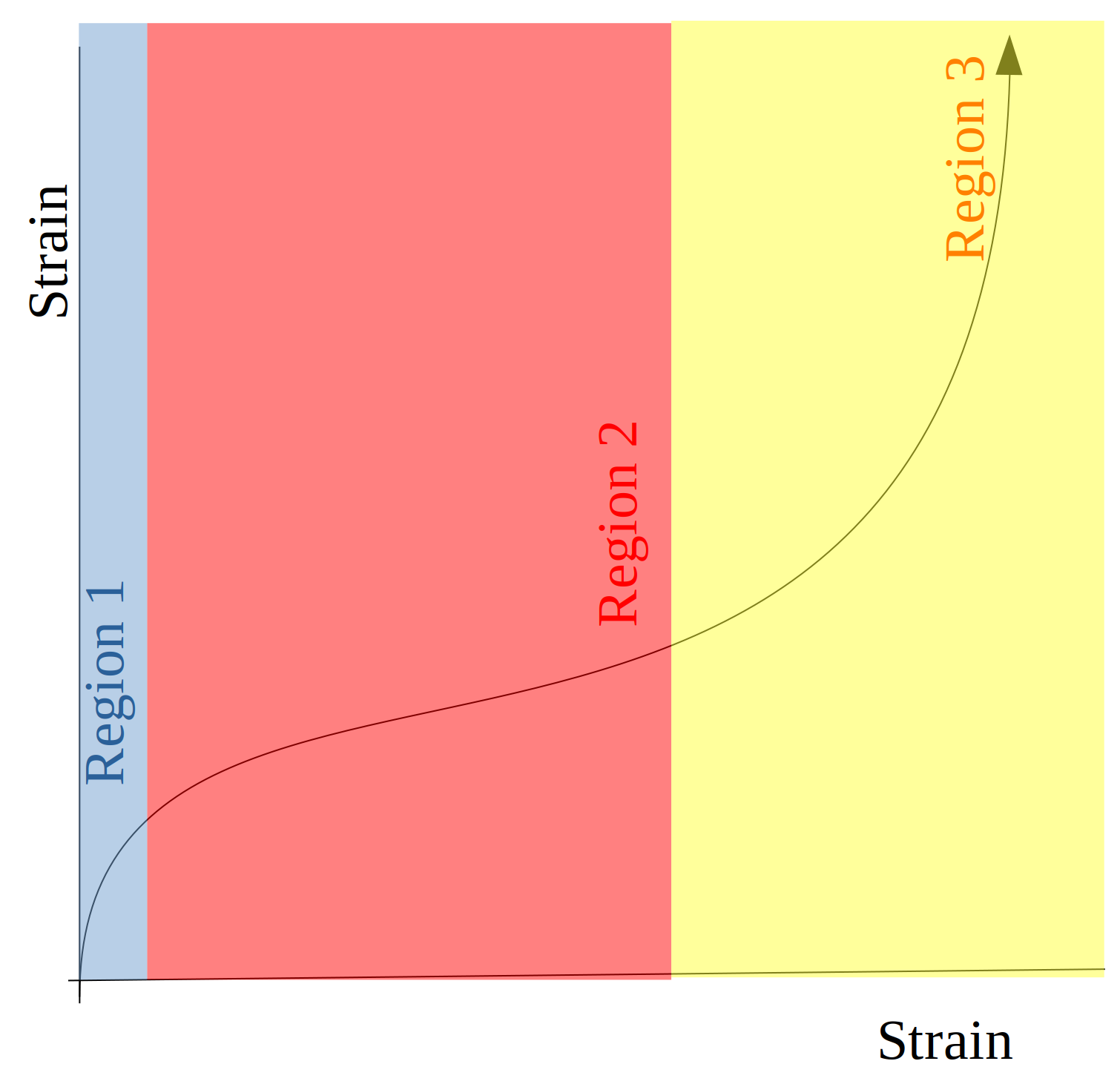
Sketch of a usual stress-strain curve for a latex foam. Region 1 shows Hookian increase in stress. Region 2 demonstrates the crushing plateau. Region 3 shows densification.

=== Compression ===
Latex foams demonstrate a stress-strain curve with three regions when compressed. This relates to the resistive force expressed by the foam when a load or force is applied to it. The shape of different regions of the curve will reflect some important quality of the foam relating to compression or relaxation stress and strain behaviour of the material.

First, the foam will show a linear Hookian increase in stress. This happens because the gas contained in foam cells is compressed, and the walls of the cells maintain their structure. In the second region, the cell walls are being crushed, and no additional stress is experienced, and so the stress plateaus. In the third region, the foam increases in density as crushed cell wall material is compressed into itself. This leads to a steep increase in stress in the region of densification.

=== Resistance to dynamic fatigue ===
Relating to the longevity of the material, the resistance to dynamic fatigue is tested by recursively compressing a foam and allowing it to relax. The resistance of the foam to dynamic fatigue can then be measured either by visually observing the structure of the cells to note what proportion of cell walls has broken or ruptured, or by measuring the change in physical properties like the thickness of the material.

=== Thermal conductivity ===
The low thermal conductivity of latex foams is affected by four factors: heat conduction of the polymer, heat conduction of the gas within the air bubbles, convection of gas inside the cells (less important for small to medium size cells), and radiation through the foam.

There are several ways conductivity can be affected through these factors:

1. lower temperature to lower heat radiation;
2. decrease cell size to decrease convection and radiation (due to more reflections within the cell walls);
3. decrease foam density to decrease conduction through the solid polymer;
4. replace air for a less conductive gas inside the cells.

=== Energy absorption ===
Energy absorption is a particularly important quality of latex foam.

Most energy absorption occurs in the first and second regions of the strain-stress curve. In less elastomeric polymers, the cell walls are more brittle and therefore can get crushed more easily. In this case, most of the absorption occurs in the second region of the curve caused by the deformation and crushing of cell walls. This means that each cell can only contribute once to such absorption (that is, cells are getting crushed and therefore used up).

For a more elastomeric polymer, the cell walls are more flexible and can take more impact. The cell wall in this case may bend and the cell becomes squeezed, but the cell will eventually return to its original shape. Most energy absorption therefore occurs in the first region of the stress-strain graph. The foam can also handle more instances of impact as the cells do not become depleted as easily. This is a significant environmental improvement.

== Classification and additives ==
=== Choice of polymer ===
==== Traditional polymer choices ====
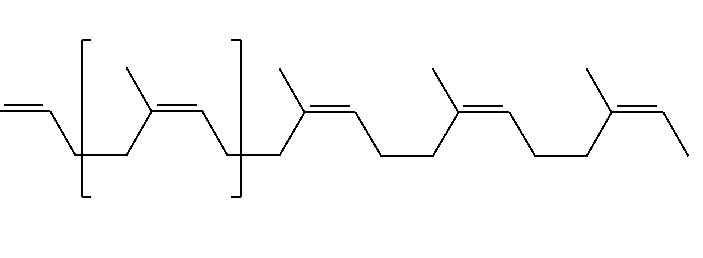
Polyisoprene polymer, the main component of natural rubber latex usually extracted from Hevea brasiliensis.

Historically, natural rubber latex was used, and foams were produced using the Dunlop processes. Styrene-butadiene rubber latex rose to prominence once high-solids concentrates, which were designed specifically for foaming, began to be sold on the market. Properties of this polymer were fairly similar to natural rubber latex, so the competition between the two choices here is mostly economical.

==== Polymer choices for variation in properties ====
Other kinds of polymers were chosen for their properties and how they affect the properties of the foam in turn. For example, polychloroprene foam rubber is more difficult to burn and provides a less flammable alternative to traditional latex foam. Acrylonitrile-butadienelatex foam rubber is resistant to swelling in hydrocarbon oils.

=== Fillers ===
==== Structural fillers ====
These are fillers meant to increase the stability and load bearing capabilities of the foam latex while increasing expansion and therefore lowering the coast of materials. However, adding fillers also affects the desirable properties of the latex foam, such as by decreasing extension at break and resistance to repeated occurrences of stress and relaxation.

Mineral fillers like kaolinite clays and calcium carbonates can be added during the whipping phase (in the batch process) or mixing phase (in the continuous process) to the latex foam. Wet-ground micas can similarly be added into the latex during foaming, and they tend to have a lower impact on tensile strength and extension at break. However, micas tend to cause more shrinking to the product at the unmolding phase.

==== Flame retardants ====
Since latex foams are a fire hazard, there are efforts to incorporate fillers into the foams to decrease their flammability. Such fillers include chlorinated paraffin hydrocarbons, antimony trioxide, zinc borate, and hydrated aluminum oxide.

==== Naturally sourced fillers ====
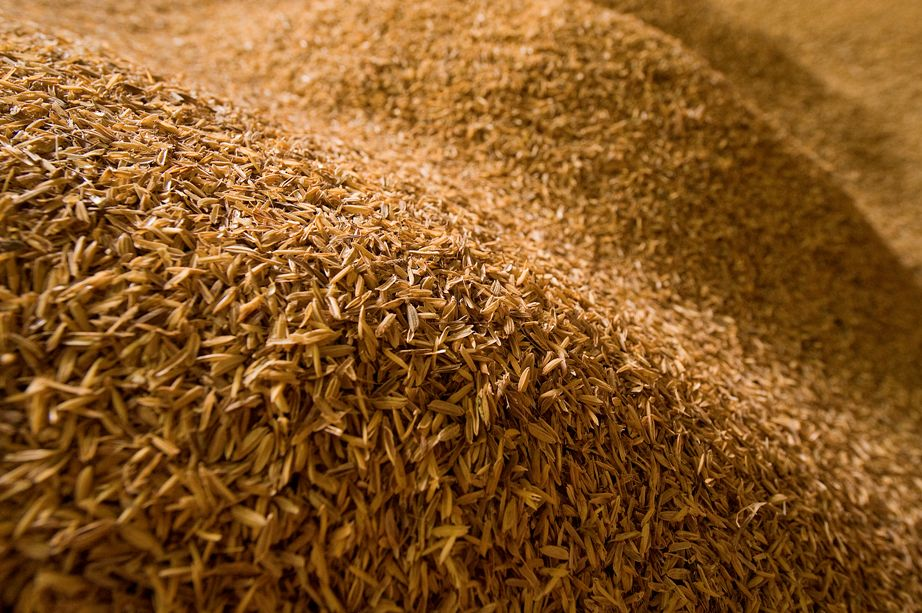
Rice husk, an organic agricultural waste product from the farming of rice. Rice husk powder can be used as a foam latex filler. (Reference 6)

These are materials that improve the structural properties of latex foam while also making it more environmentally friendly through increased biodegradability. A particular interest is using organic waste products to create these fillers.

Eggshell powder is an example of such a filler which can be added into the latex foam to manipulate the properties of the product and increase its environmental friendliness. Similarly to mineral fillers, eggshell powder increases compression stress, compression set, hardness, and density of the foam while decreasing tensile strength and extension at break. This filler also decreases the thermal stability of the material produced, but adding resin, another possible organic filler, was found to increase the tensile strength of eggshell powder filled natural rubber polymer foam.

Another proposed filler with similar properties was rice husk powder, which increases load bearing properties of the foam while decreasing tensile strength and extension at break. This was also found to increase the biodegradability of the foam for improved control over post-consumer waste of these products.

== Applications ==
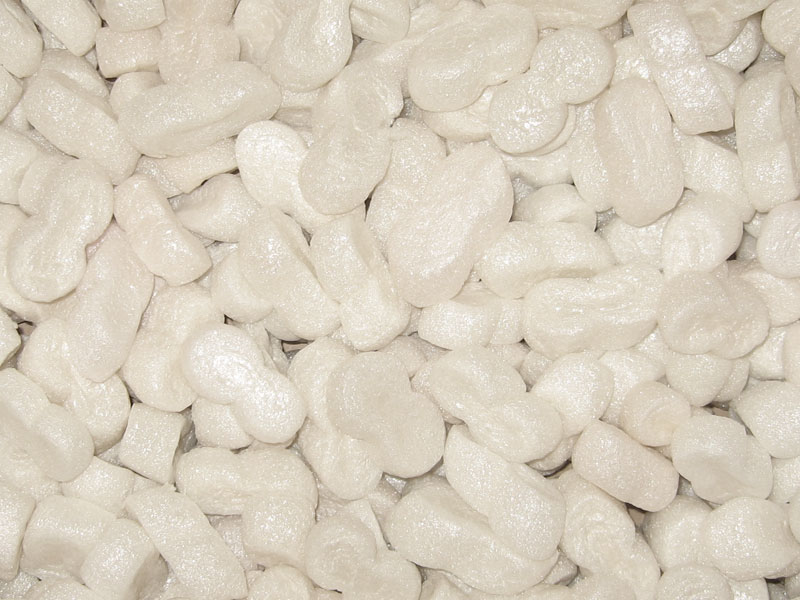
Foam peanuts, a single-use polymer foam used for packaging to decrease impact on shipped items.

=== Transportation ===
Due to their energy absorption properties, latex foams are useful for transportation applications, such as in packaging to decrease impact on the shipped product or in vehicle upholstery. While packaging foams may be single-use with low resistance to dynamic fatigue, upholstery tends to benefit from being denser and more resistant to fatigue as it absorbs lower impacts but needs to do so more repeatedly.

=== Furniture ===
Latex foams can be used in items like bedding, upholstery, and pillows for cushioning purposes due to their expressed stress-strain curve when experiencing a load.

=== Soundproofing ===
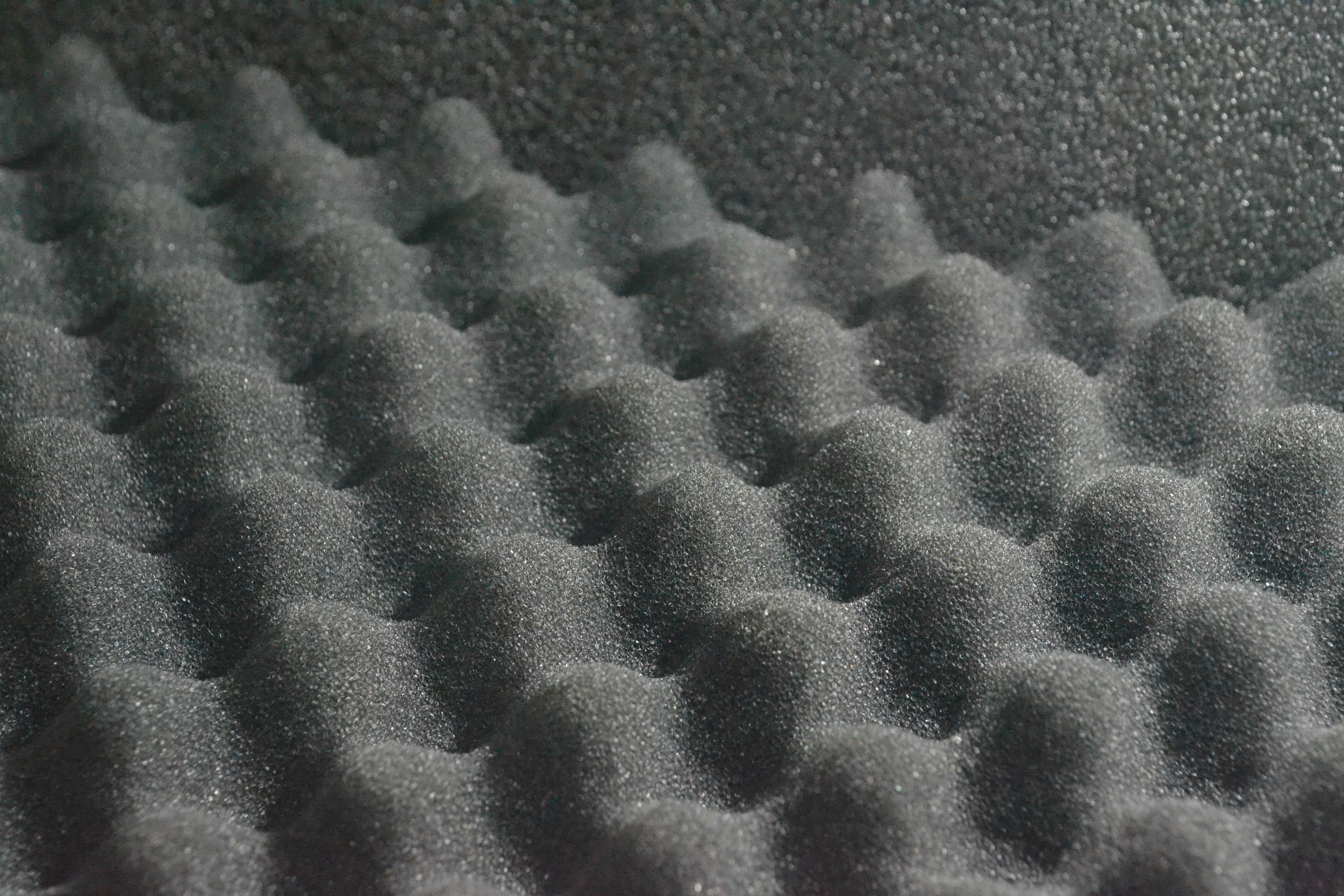
Acoustic foam used in soundproofing.

As they contain air bubbles, latex foams carry some soundproofing properties. In particular, both natural rubber and styrene-butadiene latex foam are found to be good at soundproofing, but styrene-butadiene foams tend to be better for this purpose.

=== Separation of oil and water ===
Oil pollution in water bodies is a major environmental concern. Separating oil and water is helpful both to clean the water and recover the oil. Latex foams are hydrophobic and absorbent, in addition to being resilient and recyclable, and can therefore be used to absorb the oil in water-oil mixtures to separate them.

=== Sports, arts, and recreation ===
Foam latex is used in masks and facial prosthetics to change a person's outward appearance. The Wizard of Oz was one of the first films to make extensive use of foam latex prosthetics in the 1930s.

Theatrical latex foam is a specialized latex foam which is softer than commercial latex foam. It can be used in various arts and crafts including puppetry and costumes because of its ability to pick up small details of painting as well as its strength. Miss Piggy, Statler and Waldorf in Jim Henson's The Muppet Show as well as characters in Henson's next production, The Dark Crystal, were some of the first puppets created from latex foams used on a large scale.

Artists such as Lordi and Gwar wear costumes that include this material.

Latex foam is also widespread in the manufacture of modern soccer goalkeeper gloves. The material has proven to be the most effective way of allowing players to grip the football in wet and dry playing conditions, as well as providing damping properties which help in catching. A variety of treatments are applied to latex foam to produce different types of foam with varying properties to assist performance. Some, for example, are designed to offer a high level of grip; whereas others are designed to offer maximum durability.
