= Harmonic generation =

Nonlinear optical process

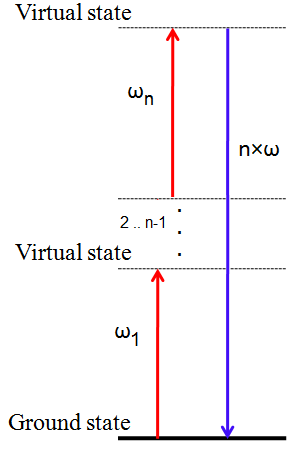
N-th harmonic generation

Harmonic generation (HG, also called multiple harmonic generation) is a nonlinear optical process in which $n$ photons with the same frequency interact with a nonlinear material, are "combined", and generate a new photon with $n$ times the energy of the initial photons (equivalently, $n$ times the frequency and the wavelength divided by $n$).

== General process ==
In a medium having a substantial nonlinear susceptibility, harmonic generation is possible. Note that for even orders ($n = 2,4,\dots$), the medium must have no center of symmetry (non-centrosymmetrical).

Because the process requires that many photons are present at the same time and at the same place, the generation process has a low probability to occur, and this probability decreases with the order $n$. To generate efficiently, the symmetry of the medium must allow the signal to be amplified (through phase matching, for instance), and the light source must be intense and well-controlled spatially (with a collimated laser) and temporally (more signal if the laser has short pulses).

== Sum-frequency generation (SFG) ==
A special case in which the number of photons in the interaction is $n = 2$, but with two different photons at frequencies $\omega_1$ and $\omega_2$.

== Second-harmonic generation (SHG) ==
A special case in which the number of photons in the interaction is $n = 2$. Also a special case of sum-frequency generation in which both photons are at the same frequency $\omega$.

== Third-harmonic generation (THG) ==
A special case in which the number of photons in the interaction is $n = 3$, if all the photons have the same frequency $\omega$. If they have different frequency, the general term of four-wave mixing is preferred. This process involves the 3rd order nonlinear susceptibility $\chi^{(3)}$.

Unlike SHG, it is a volumetric process and has been shown in liquids. However, it is enhanced at interfaces.

=== Materials used for THG ===
Nonlinear crystals such as BBO (β-BaB_{2}O_{4}) or LBO can convert THG, otherwise THG can be generated from membranes in microscopy.

== Fourth-harmonic generation (FHG or 4HG) ==
A special case in which the number of photons in interaction is $n = 4$. Reported around the year 2000, powerful lasers now enable efficient FHG. This process involves the 4th order nonlinear susceptibility $\chi^{(4)}$.

=== Materials used for FHG ===
Some BBO (β-BaB_{2}O_{4}) are used for FHG.

== Harmonic generation for $n > 4$ ==
Harmonic generation for $n = 5$ (5HG) or more is theoretically possible, but the interaction requires a very high number of photons to interact and has therefore a low probability to happen: the signal at higher harmonics will be very low, and requires very intense lasers to be generated. To generate high harmonics (like $n = 30$ and so on), the substantially different process of high harmonic generation can be used.

== Sources ==
- Boyd, R.W. (2007). Nonlinear optics (third ed.). Elsevier. ISBN 9780123694706.
- Sutherland, Richard L. (2003). Handbook of Nonlinear Optics (2nd ed.). CRC Press. ISBN 9780824742430.
- Hecht, Eugene (2002). Optics (4th ed.). Addison-Wesley. ISBN 978-0805385663.
- Zernike, Frits; Midwinter, John E. (2006). Applied Nonlinear Optics. Dover Publications. ISBN 978-0486453606.

== See also ==
- Nonlinear optics
- Second-harmonic generation
- High harmonic generation
- Optical frequency multiplier
