= Kleinman symmetry =

Kleinman symmetry, named after American physicist D.A. Kleinman, gives a method of reducing the number of distinct coefficients in the rank-3 second order nonlinear optical susceptibility when the applied frequencies are much smaller than any resonant frequencies.

== Formulation ==
Assuming an instantaneous response we can consider the second order polarisation to be given by $P(t) = \epsilon_0 \chi^{(2)}E^2(t)$ for $E$ the applied field onto a nonlinear medium.

For a lossless medium with spatial indices $i,j,k$ we already have full permutation symmetry, where the spatial indices and frequencies are permuted simultaneously according to

$$\begin{align}& \chi_{ijk}^{(2)}(\omega_3;\omega_1+\omega_2) = \chi_{jki}^{(2)}(\omega_1;-\omega_2+\omega_3) = \chi_{kij}^{(2)}(\omega_2;\omega_3-\omega_1) \\
= &\chi_{ikj}^{(2)}(\omega_3;\omega_2+\omega_1) = \chi_{kji}^{(2)}(\omega_2;-\omega_1+\omega_3)
= \chi_{jik}^{(2)}(\omega_1;\omega_3-\omega_2)\end{align}$$

In the regime where all frequencies $\omega_i \ll \omega_0$ for resonance $\omega_0$ then this response must be independent of the applied frequencies, i.e. the susceptibility should be dispersionless, and so we can permute the spatial indices without also permuting the frequency arguments:

$$\begin{align}& \chi_{ijk}^{(2)}(\omega_3;\omega_1+\omega_2) = \chi_{jki}^{(2)}(\omega_3;\omega_1+\omega_2) = \chi_{kij}^{(2)}(\omega_3;\omega_1+\omega_2) \\
= &\chi_{ikj}^{(2)}(\omega_3;\omega_1+\omega_2) = \chi_{kji}^{(2)}(\omega_3;\omega_1+\omega_2)
= \chi_{jik}^{(2)}(\omega_3;\omega_1+\omega_2)\end{align}$$

This is the Kleinman symmetry condition.

== In second harmonic generation ==
Kleinman symmetry in general is too strong a condition to impose, however it is useful for certain cases like in second harmonic generation (SHG). Here, it is always possible to permute the last two indices, meaning it is convenient to use the contracted notation

Table showing the relabelling for contracted notation in SHG

$d_{il} = \frac{1}{2}\chi^{(2)}_{ijk}(\omega_3;\omega_1,\omega_2)$

which is a 3x6 rank-2 tensor where the index $l$ is related to combinations of indices as shown in the figure. This notation is used in section VII of Kleinman's original work on the subject in 1962.

Note that for processes other than SHG there may be further, or fewer reduction of the number of terms required to fully describe the second order polarisation response.

== See also ==
- Nonlinear optics
- Second-harmonic generation
- Crystal symmetry
