= Zinc borate =

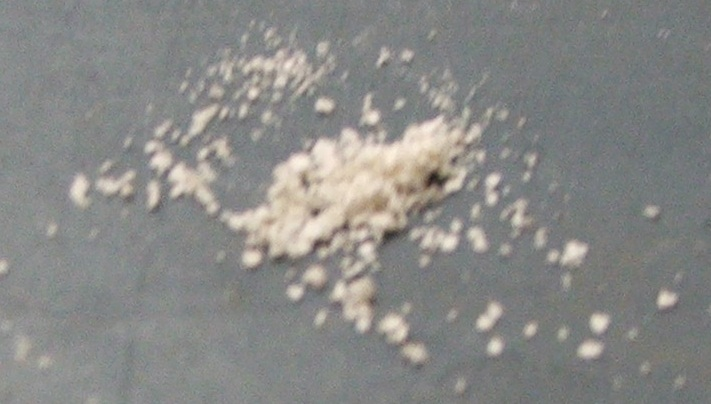

Identifiers
CAS Number	1332-07-6; tetrahydrate: 12513-27-8; B_{6}O_{18}Zn_{9}: 12280-01-2
PubChem CID	167155; B_{6}O_{11}Zn_{2}: 92043228; tetrahydrate: 56846126; B_{6}O_{18}Zn_{9}: 57347166
UNII	21LB2V459E
- Except where otherwise noted, data are given for materials in their standard state (at 25 °C [77 °F], 100 kPa). Infobox references

Zinc borate refers to a family of inorganic compounds consisting of borate of zinc. They are white solids with the formulas:

- ZnO·B_{2}O_{3}·1.12H_{2}O
- ZnO·B_{2}O_{3}·~ 2H_{2}O
- ZnO·5B_{2}O_{3}·4.5H_{2}O
- 2ZnO·3B_{2}O_{3}·3H_{2}O
- 2ZnO·3B_{2}O_{3}·7H_{2}O
- 3ZnO·5B_{2}O_{3}·14H_{2}O
- 4ZnO·B_{2}O_{3}·H_{2}O
- 6ZnO·5B_{2}O_{3}·3H_{2}O

They are coordination polymers consisting of zinc(II) centers bonded to cyclic boron oxide rings.

Part of one zinc borate showing the chain of boron-oxide rings that bind to the zinc ion

== Variants ==
Several variants of zinc borate exist, differing by the zinc/boron ratio and the water content:

- Zinc borate Firebrake ZB (2ZnO·3B_{2}O_{3}·3.5H_{2}O), CAS number 138265-88-0
- Zinc borate Firebrake 500 (2ZnO_{3}·3B_{2}O_{3}), CAS number 12767-90-7
- Zinc borate Firebrake 415 (4ZnO·B_{2}O_{3}·H_{2}O), CAS number 149749-62-2
- ZB-467 (4ZnO·6B_{2}O_{3}·7H_{2}O), CAS number 1332-07-6
- ZB-223 (2ZnO·2B_{2}O_{3}·3H_{2}O), CAS number 1332-07-6

The hydrated variants lose water between 290–415 °C (554–779 °F).

== Uses ==
Zinc borate is primarily used as a flame retardant in plastics and cellulose fibers, paper, rubbers and textiles. It is also used in paints, adhesives, and pigments. As a flame retardant, it can replace antimony(III) oxide as a synergist in both halogen-based and halogen-free systems. It is an anti-dripping and char-promoting agent, and suppresses the afterglow. In electrical insulator plastics it suppresses arcing and tracking.

In halogen-containing systems, zinc borate is used together with antimony trioxide and alumina trihydrate. It catalyzes formation of char and creates a protective layer of glass. Zinc catalyzes the release of halogens by forming zinc halides and zinc oxyhalides.

In halogen-free system, zinc borate can be used together with alumina trihydrate, magnesium hydroxide, red phosphorus, or ammonium polyphosphate. During burning the plastics, a porous borate ceramics is formed that protects the underlying layers. In presence of silica, borosilicate glass can be formed at plastic burning temperatures.

Zinc borate is used in polyvinyl chloride, polyolefins, polyamides, epoxy resins, polyesters, thermoplastic elastomers, rubbers, etc. It is also used in some intumescent systems.

Zinc borate has synergistic effect with zinc phosphate or barium borate as a corrosion inhibitor pigment.

Zinc borate acts as a broad-spectrum fungicide in plastics and wood products.

Zinc borate can be used as a flux in some ceramics. In electrical insulators it improves the ceramics properties.
