= Diode-pumped solid-state laser =

Type of laser

A diode-pumped solid-state laser (DPSSL) is a solid-state laser made by pumping a solid gain medium, for example, a ruby or a neodymium-doped YAG crystal, with a laser diode.

DPSSLs have advantages in compactness and efficiency over other types, and high power DPSSLs have replaced ion lasers and flashlamp-pumped lasers in many scientific applications, and are now appearing commonly in green and other color laser pointers.

== Coupling ==
The wavelength of laser diodes is tuned by means of temperature to produce an optimal compromise between the absorption coefficient in the crystal and energy efficiency (lowest possible pump photon energy). As waste energy is limited by the thermal lens this means higher power densities compared to high-intensity discharge lamps.

High power lasers use a single crystal, but many laser diodes are arranged in strips (multiple diodes next to each other in one substrate) or stacks (stacks of substrates). This diode grid can be imaged onto the crystal by means of a lens. Higher brightness (leading to better beam profile and longer diode lifetimes) is achieved by optically removing the dark areas between the diodes, which are needed for cooling and delivering the current. This is done in two steps:

1. The "fast axis" is collimated with an aligned grating of cylindrical micro-lenses.
2. The partially collimated beams are then imaged at reduced size into the crystal. The crystal can be pumped longitudinally from both end faces or transversely from three or more sides.

The beams from multiple diodes can also be combined by coupling each diode into an optical fiber, which is placed precisely over the diode (but behind the micro-lens). At the other end of the fiber bundle, the fibers are fused together to form a uniform, gap-less, round profile on the crystal. This also permits the use of a remote power supply.

=== Some numbers ===
High power laser diodes are fabricated as bars with multiple single strip laser diodes next to each other.

Each single strip diode typically has an active volume of:

1 μm	2 mm	100 μm
Height	Depth	Width
fast axis	optical axis	slow axis

and depending on the cooling technique for the whole bar (100 to 200) μm distance to the next laser diode.

The end face of the diode along the fast axis can be imaged onto strip of 1 μm height. But the end face along the slow axis can be imaged onto a smaller area than 100 μm. This is due to the small divergence (hence the name: 'slow axis') which is given by the ratio of depth to width. Using the above numbers the fast axis could be imaged onto a 5 μm wide spot.

So to get a beam which is equal divergence in both axis, the end faces of a bar composed of 5 laser diodes, can be imaged by means of 4 (acylindrical) cylinder lenses onto an image plane with 5 spots each with a size of 5 mm x 1 mm. This large size is needed for low divergence beams. Low divergence allows paraxial optics, which is cheaper, and which is used to not only generate a spot, but a long beam waist inside the laser crystal (length = 50 mm), which is to be pumped through its end faces.

Also in the paraxial case it is much easier to use gold or copper mirrors or glass prisms to stack the spots on top of each other, and get a 5 x 5 mm beam profile. A second pair of (spherical) lenses image this square beam profile inside the laser crystal.

A volume of 0.001 mm^{3} active volume in the laser diode is able to saturate 1250 mm^{3} in a Nd:YVO_{4} crystal.

== Common DPSSL processes ==
Neodymium ions in various types of ionic crystals, and also in glasses, act as a laser gain medium, typically emitting 1,064 nm light from a particular atomic transition in the neodymium ion, after being "pumped" into excitation from an external source. Selection of 946 nm transition light is possible, as well

The most common DPSSL in use is the 532 nm wavelength green laser pointer. A powerful (>200 mW) 808 nm wavelength infrared GaAlAs laser diode pumps a neodymium-doped yttrium aluminium garnet (Nd:YAG) or a neodymium-doped yttrium orthovanadate (Nd:YVO_{4}) crystal which produces 1064 nm wavelength light from the main spectral transition of neodymium ion. This light is then frequency doubled using a nonlinear optical process in a KTP crystal, producing 532 nm light. Green DPSSLs are usually around 20% efficient, although some lasers can reach up to 35% efficiency. In other words, a green DPSSL using a 2.5 W pump diode would be expected to output around 500-900 mW of 532 nm light.

In optimal conditions, Nd:YVO_{4} has a conversion efficiency of 60%, while KTP has a conversion efficiency of 80%. In other words, a green DPSSL can theoretically have an overall efficiency of 48%.

In the realm of very high output powers, the KTP crystal becomes susceptible to optical damage. Thus, high-power DPSSLs generally have a larger beam diameter, as the 1064 nm laser is expanded before it reaches the KTP crystal, reducing the irradiance from the infrared light. In order to maintain a lower beam diameter, a crystal with a higher damage threshold, such as lithium triborate (LBO), is used instead.

Blue DPSSLs use a nearly identical process, except that the 808 nm light is being converted by an Nd:YAG crystal to 946 nm light (selecting this non-principal spectral line of neodymium in the same Nd-doped crystals), which is then frequency-doubled to 473 nm by a beta barium borate (BBO) crystal or LBO crystal. Because of the lower gain for the materials, blue lasers are relatively weak, and are only around 3-5% efficient. In the late 2000s, it was discovered that bismuth triborate (BiBO) crystals were more efficient than BBO or LBO for second harmonic generation in mode-locked lasers and do not have the disadvantage of being hygroscopic, which degrades the crystal if it is exposed to moisture. In continuous-wave laser applications, however, BiBO may exhibit instabilities which degrade its performance.

Yellow DPSSLs use an even more complicated process: An 808 nm pump diode is used to generate 1,064 nm and 1,342 nm light, which are summed in parallel to become 593.5 nm. Due to their complexity, most yellow DPSSLs are only around 1% efficient, and usually more expensive per unit of power.

Another method is to generate 1,064 and 1,319 nm light, which are summed to 589 nm. This process is more efficient, with about 3% of the pump diode's power being converted to yellow light.

== Comparison to diode lasers ==
DPSSLs and diode lasers are two of the most common types of solid-state lasers. However, both types have their advantages and disadvantages.

DPSSLs generally have a higher beam quality and can reach very high powers while maintaining a relatively good beam quality. Because the crystal pumped by the diode acts as its own laser, the quality of the output beam is independent of that of the input beam. In comparison, diode lasers can only reach a few hundred milliwatts unless they operate in multiple transverse mode. Such multi-mode lasers have a larger beam diameter and a greater divergence, which often makes them less desirable. In fact, single-mode operation is essential in some applications, such as optical drives.

On the other hand, diode lasers are cheaper and more energy efficient. As DPSSL crystals are not 100% efficient, some power is lost when the frequency is converted. DPSSLs are also more sensitive to temperature and can only operate optimally within a small range. Otherwise, the laser would suffer from stability issues, such as hopping between modes and large fluctuations in the output power. DPSSLs also require a more complex construction.

Diode lasers can also be precisely modulated with a greater frequency than DPSSLs.

Neodymium-doped solid state lasers continue to be the laser source of choice for industrial applications. Direct pumping of the upper Nd laser level at 885-nm (rather than at the more traditional broad 808-nm band) offers the potential of improved performance through a reduction in the lasing quantum defect, thereby improving system efficiency, reducing cooling requirements, and enabling further TEM00 power scaling. Because of the narrow 885-nm absorption feature in Nd:YAG, certain systems may benefit from the use of wavelength-locked diode pump sources, which serve to narrow and stabilize the pump emission spectrum to keep it closely aligned to this absorption feature. To date, high power diode laser locking schemes such as internal distributed feedback Bragg gratings and externally aligned volume holographic grating optics, VHG's, have not been widely implemented due to the increased cost and assumed performance penalty of the technology. However, recent advancements in the manufacture of stabilized diode pump sources which utilize external wavelength locking now offer improved spectral properties with little-to-no impact on power and efficiency. Benefits of this approach include improvements in laser efficiency, spectral linewidth, and pumping efficiency.
