= Laser damage threshold =

Limit at which an optical material will be damaged by a laser

The laser damage threshold (LDT) or laser induced damage threshold (LIDT) is the limit at which an optic or material will be damaged by a laser given the fluence (energy per area), intensity (power per area), and wavelength. LDT values are relevant to both transmissive and reflective optical elements and in applications where the laser induced modification or destruction of a material is the intended outcome.

== Mechanisms ==
=== Thermal ===
For long pulses or continuous wave lasers the primary damage mechanism tends to be thermal. Since both transmitting and reflecting optics have non-zero absorption, the laser can deposit thermal energy into the optic. At a certain point, there can be sufficient localized heating to either affect the material properties or induce thermal shock.

=== Dielectric breakdown ===
Dielectric breakdown occurs in insulating materials whenever the electric field is sufficient to induce electrical conductivity. Although this concept is more common in the context of DC and relatively low frequency AC electrical engineering the electromagnetic fields from a pulsed laser can be sufficient to induce this effect, causing damaging structural and chemical changes to the optic.

=== Avalanche breakdown ===
For very short, high power pulses, avalanche breakdown can occur. At these exceptionally high intensities, multiphoton absorption can cause the rapid ionization of atoms of the optic. This plasma readily absorbs the laser energy, leading to the liberation of more electrons and a run-away "avalanche" effect, capable of causing significant damage to the optic.

== Mitigation ==
Optical systems can mitigate the effects of laser damage both by increasing the LDT of the optics used and by changing the laser beam characteristics. The use of high reflectivity (HR) dielectric mirrors instead of metal mirrors is a common strategy. Further, the beam can be expanded, reducing the fluence present on optics. Finally, the beam can be temporally stretched, i.e. "chirped", to reduce the power incident on the optic. The use of chirped beams was the key innovation in chirped pulse amplification, a technique which permits the generation of petawatt class beams which was awarded the 2018 Nobel Prize in Physics.

== Applications ==
Some applications make use of laser breakdown directly, necessitating knowledge of the materials' LDT properties. Some examples include:

- Laser cutting
- Pulsed laser deposition
- Certain laser medicine techniques
- Plasma generation, especially for wakefield acceleration
- Laser weapons

== Standards ==
ISO 21254 is an international standard that specifies the procedures and definitions for measuring the laser-induced damage threshold (LIDT) of optical materials, it is divided into the following parts:

- Part 1: Definitions and general principles.
- Part 2: Procedures for the measurement of damage threshold (includes damage probability and site density).
- Part 3: Additional methods and guidelines for laser sources and testing arrangements.
- Part 4: Inspection, detection and measurement
