= Lithium triborate =

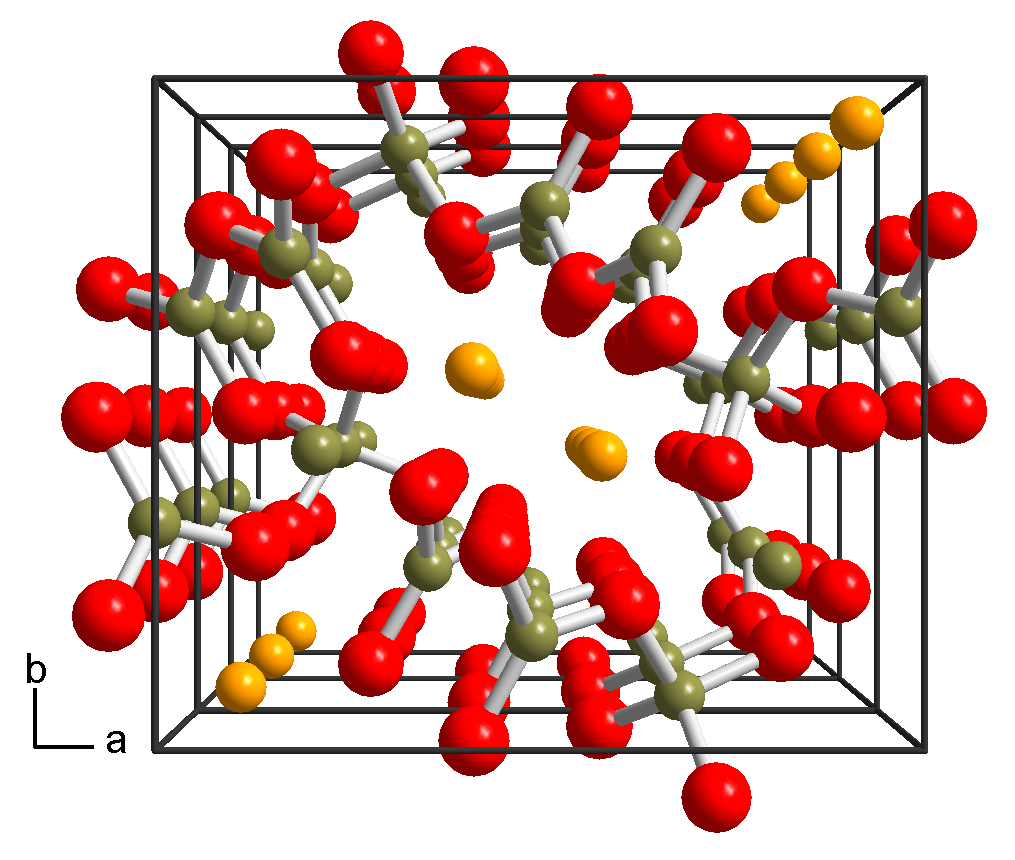
- __Li^{+} __ B^{3+} __ O^{2−}

Identifiers
CAS Number	12007-41-9
3D model (JSmol)	Interactive image
ChemSpider	65321981
PubChem CID	23716905
- InChI: InChI=1S/B3O5.Li/c4-1-7-3(6)8-2-5;/q-1;+1 Key: VCZFPTGOQQOZGI-UHFFFAOYSA-N
- SMILES: [Li+].B(=O)OB([O-])OB=O

Properties
Chemical formula	LiB_{3}O_{5}
Molar mass	119.37 g·mol^{−1}
Appearance	Colorless crystalline solid
Density	2.747 g/cm^{3}
Melting point	834 °C (1,533 °F; 1,107 K)
Refractive index (n_{D})	1.5656

Structure
Molecular shape	Orthorhombic
- Except where otherwise noted, data are given for materials in their standard state (at 25 °C [77 °F], 100 kPa). verify (what is ?) Infobox references

Lithium triborate (LiB_{3}O_{5}) or LBO is a non-linear optical crystal. It has a wide transparency range, moderately high nonlinear coupling, high damage threshold and desirable chemical and mechanical properties. This crystal is often used for second harmonic generation (SHG, also known as frequency doubling), for example of Nd:YAG lasers (1064 nm → 532 nm). LBO can be both critically and non-critically phase-matched. In the latter case the crystal has to be heated or cooled depending on the wavelength.

Lithium triborate was discovered and developed by Chen Chuangtian and others of the Fujian Institute of Research on the Structure of Matter, Chinese Academy of Sciences. It has been patented.

== Chemical properties ==
- Point group: mm2
- Lattice parameters: a=8.4473 Å, b=7.3788 Å, c=5.1395 Å
- Mohs hardness: 6
- Transmission range: 0.16 – 2.6 μm
- Damage threshold: 25 J/cm^{2} (1064 nm, 10 ns pulses)
- Thermal expansion coefficients: x: 10.8×10^{−5}/K, y: −8.8×10^{−5}/K, z: 3.4×10^{−5}/K
- Specific heat: 1060 J/kg·K
- Melting point: 834 °C

== Applications of lithium triborate (LBO) crystal ==
Lithium triborate (LBO) crystals are applicable in various nonlinear optical applications:

- Frequency doubling and frequency tripling of high peak power pulsed Nd doped, Ti-sapphire lasers and dye lasers
- NCPM (non-critical phase matching) for frequency conversion of CW and quasi CW radiation
- OPO (Optical parametric oscillator) of both Type 1 and Type 2 phase-matching
