= Barium borate =

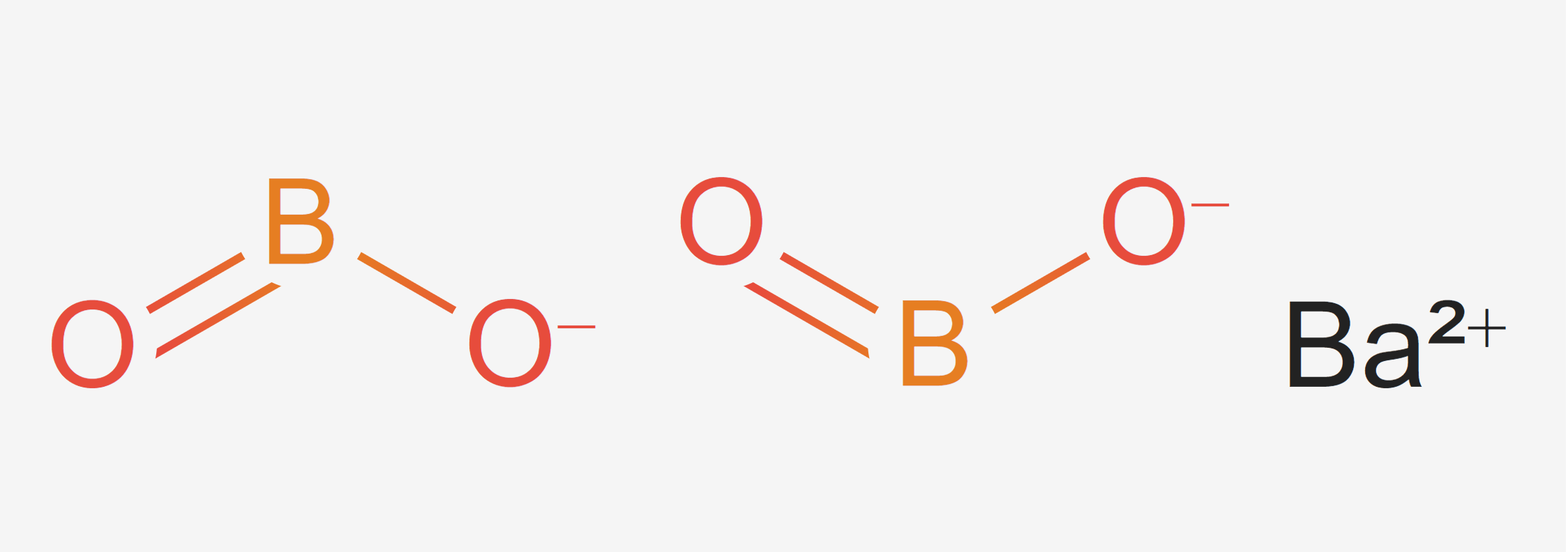
- Barium Borate

Names
- Other names: Barium diborate; Barium boron oxide; Barium metaborate

Identifiers
CAS Number	13701-59-2; 19004-06-9 (monohydrate); 38720-52-4 (dihydrate)
3D model (JSmol)	Interactive image
ChemSpider	3642855
ECHA InfoCard	100.033.824
EC Number	237-222-4
PubChem CID	6101043; 23165673 (monohydrate)
UNII	5SE5SRJ05N
CompTox Dashboard (EPA)	DTXSID1034347
- InChI: InChI=1S/2BO2.Ba/c2*2-1-3;/q2*-1;+2 Key: QBLDFAIABQKINO-UHFFFAOYSA-N; InChI=1/2BO2.Ba/c2*2-1-3;/q2*-1;+2 Key: QBLDFAIABQKINO-UHFFFAOYAX
- SMILES: [Ba+2].[O-]B=O.[O-]B=O

Properties
Chemical formula	BaB_{2}O_{4} or Ba(BO_{2})_{2}
Molar mass	222.94 g·mol^{−1}
Appearance	white powder or colorless crystals
Odor	odorless
Density	3.85 g/cm^{3}
Melting point	1,095 °C (2,003 °F; 1,368 K)
Solubility in hydrochloric acid	soluble
Refractive index (n_{D})	n_{e} = 1.5534, n_{o} = 1.6776

Structure
Crystal structure	Rhombohedral, hR126
Space group	R3c, No. 161
Lattice constant	a = 1.2529 nm, c = 1.274 nm

Hazards
- GHS labelling
Pictograms	(GHS07: Exclamation mark)
Signal word	Warning
Hazard statements	H302
Precautionary statements	P264, P270, P301+P312, P330, P501
Flash point	Non-flammable
Safety data sheet (SDS)	MSDS

Related compounds
Other cations	Magnesium borate; Calcium borate; Strontium borate
- Except where otherwise noted, data are given for materials in their standard state (at 25 °C [77 °F], 100 kPa). verify (what is ?) Infobox references

Barium borate is an inorganic compound, a borate of barium with a chemical formula BaB_{2}O_{4} or Ba(BO_{2})_{2}. It is available as a hydrate or dehydrated form, as white powder or colorless crystals. The crystals exist in the high-temperature α phase and low-temperature β phase, abbreviated as BBO; both phases are birefringent, and BBO is a common nonlinear optical material.

Barium borate was discovered and developed by Chen Chuangtian and others of the Fujian Institute of Research on the Structure of Matter, Chinese Academy of Sciences.

== Properties ==
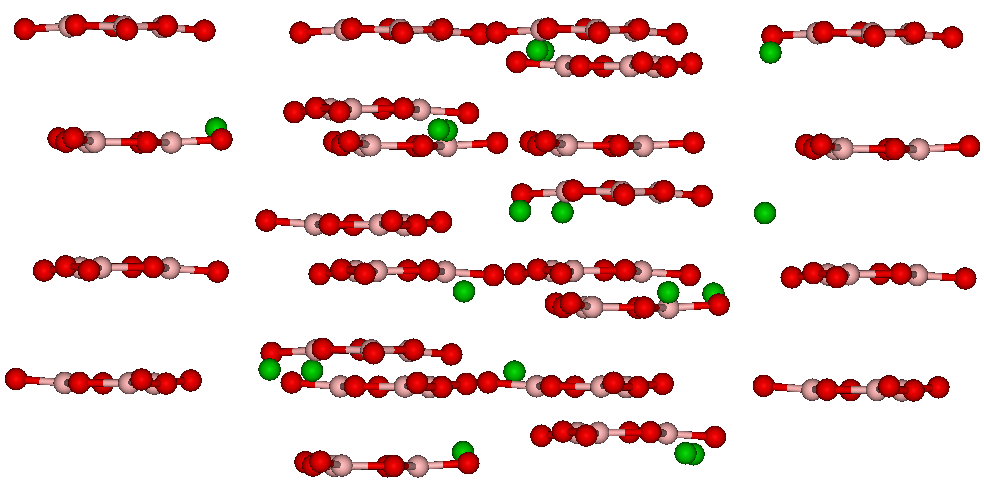
Crystal structure of BBO viewed nearly perpendicular to the c-axis. Colors: green – Ba, pink – B, red – O

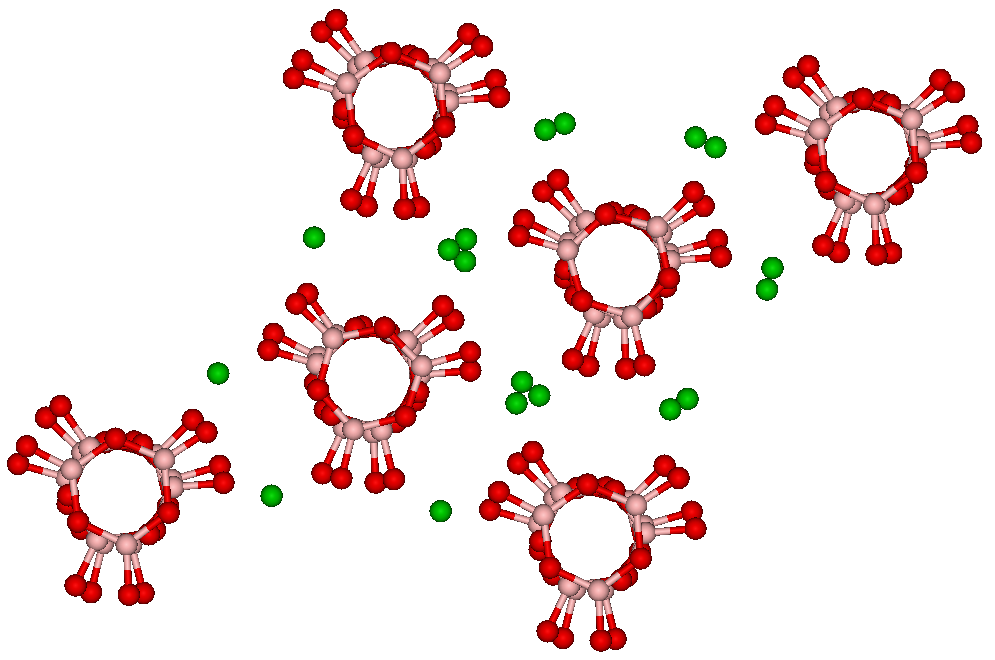
BBO viewed along the c axis

Barium borate exists in three major crystalline forms: alpha, beta, and gamma. The low-temperature beta phase converts into the alpha phase upon heating to 925 °C (1,697 °F). β-Barium borate (BBO) differs from the α form by the positions of the barium ions within the crystal. Both phases are birefringent, however the α phase possesses centric symmetry and thus does not have the same nonlinear properties as the β phase.

Alpha barium borate, α-BaB_{2}O_{4} is an optical material with a very wide optical transmission window from about 190 nm to 3500 nm. It has good mechanical properties and is a suitable material for high-power ultraviolet polarization optics. It can replace calcite, titanium dioxide or lithium niobate in Glan–Taylor prisms, Glan–Thompson prisms, walk-off beam splitters and other optical components. It has low hygroscopicity, and its Mohs hardness is 4.5. Its damage threshold is 1 GW/cm^{2} at 1064 nm and 500 MW/cm^{2} at 355 nm.

Beta barium borate, β-BaB_{2}O_{4}, is a nonlinear optical material transparent in the range ~190–3300 nm. It can be used for spontaneous parametric down-conversion. Its Mohs hardness is also 4.5. The material exhibits a melting temperature of 1,268 K (995 °C; 1,823 °F), with anisotropic thermal expansion coefficients: $\alpha_{11} = 4 \times 10^{-6} K^{-1}$ and $\alpha_{33} = 36 \times 10^{-6} K^{-1}$ α_{33} = 36 × 10^{−6} K^{−1}.

Gamma barium borate, γ-BaB_{2}O_{4}, discovered recently, was produced by heating beta barium borate 900 °C (1,650 °F) under 3 GPa of pressure. It was found to have a monoclinic crystal structure.

Barium borate has strong negative uniaxial birefringence and can be phase-matched for type I (ooe) second-harmonic generation from 409.6 to 3500 nm. The temperature sensitivity of the indices of refraction is low, leading to an unusually large (55 °C (131 °F)) temperature phase-matching bandwidth.

Although the ambient-pressure α and β crystal phases contain only trigonal, sp^{2} hybridized, boron, BBO glass has around 40% of the boron on tetrahedral, sp^{3} hybridized, sites. In the liquid state the relative fractions of sp^{2} and sp^{3} boron are temperature-dependent, with the trigonal planar coordination favored at higher temperatures.

== Synthesis ==
Barium borate can be prepared by reaction of an aqueous solution of boric acid with barium hydroxide. The prepared γ-barium borate contains water of crystallization that can not be completely removed by drying at 120 °C (248 °F). Dehydrated γ-barium borate can be prepared by heating to 300–400 °C (572–752 °F). Calcination at about 600–800 °C (1,112–1,472 °F) causes complete conversion to the β form. BBO prepared by this method does not contain trace amounts of BaB_{2}O_{2}

BBO crystals for nonlinear optics can be grown from fluxed melt of barium borate, sodium oxide and sodium chloride.

Thin films of barium borate can be prepared by MOCVD from barium(II) hydro-tri(1-pyrazolyl)borate. Different phases can be obtained depending on deposition temperatures. Thin films of beta-barium borate can be prepared by sol-gel synthesis.

Barium borate monohydrate is prepared from the solution of barium sulfide and sodium tetraborate. It is a white powder. It is used as an additive to e.g. paints as flame retardant, mold inhibitor, and corrosion inhibitor. It is also used as a white pigment.

Barium borate dihydrate is prepared from the solution of sodium metaborate and barium chloride at 90–95 °C (194–203 °F). After cooling to room temperature, white powder is precipitated. Barium borate dihydrate loses water at above 140 °C (284 °F). It is used as a flame retardant for paints, textiles, and paper.

== Applications ==
BBO is a popular nonlinear optical crystal. Quantum linked photons are producible with beta barium borate. Barium borate is a bactericide and fungicide. It is added to paints, coatings, adhesives, plastics, and paper products.

Barium borate is resistant to ultraviolet radiation. It can act as UV stabilizer for polyvinyl chloride.

The solubility of barium borate is a disadvantage when used as a pigment. Silica-coated powders are available. The alkaline properties and the anodic passivation properties of the borate ion enhance the anticorrosion performance. Commonly available barium metaborate pigment comes in three grades; Grade I is a barium metaborate itself, grade II is compounded with 27% zinc oxide, and grade III is compounded with 18% of zinc oxide and 29% calcium sulfate. Barium borate shows synergistic performance with zinc borate.

Barium borate is used as a flux in some barium titanate and lead zirconate EIA Class 2 dielectric ceramic formulations for ceramic capacitors, in amount of about 2%. The barium-boron ratio is critical for flux performance; BaB_{2}O_{2} content adversely affects the performance of the flux.

Barium borate-fly ash glass can be used as radiation shielding. Such glasses are superior in performance to concrete and to other barium borate glasses.
