= List of petawatt lasers =

List of lasers with highest peak power

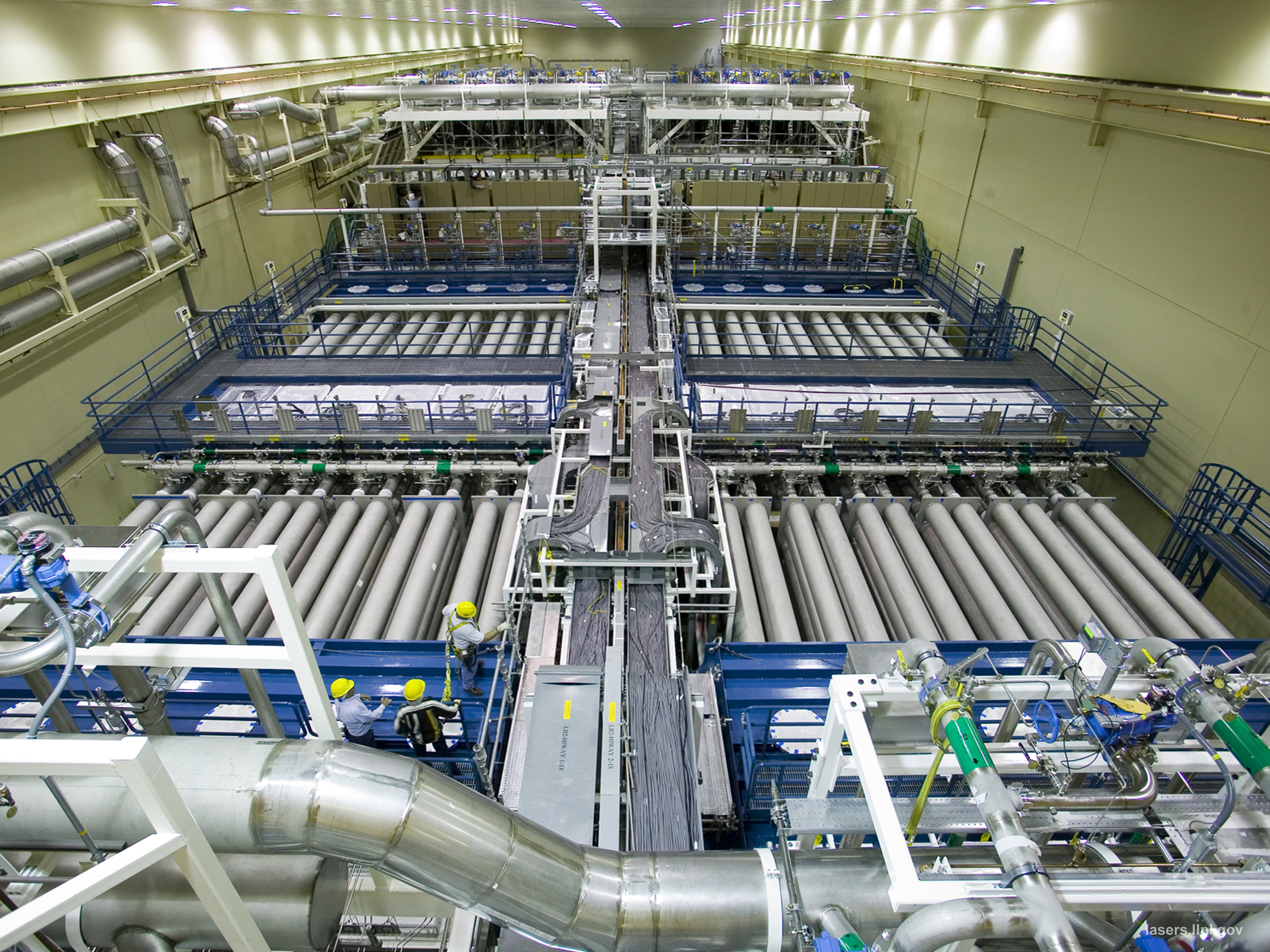
A laser bay of the National Ignition Facility. The NIF is located at the Lawrence Livermore National Laboratory.

This page contains a list of petawatt-level lasers in operation, under construction, or proposed. The list is compiled from existing academic reviews.

A petawatt laser is typically defined as a laser system whose pulse energy divided by its pulse duration reaches an order of magnitude of 10^{15} W, or 1 petawatt. These high-power laser pulses are capable of driving a strong electromagnetic field, giving rise to a number of novel applications. For instance, focusing large numbers of petawatt level lasers on a target containing deuterium and tritium creates enough energy density to drive inertial confinement fusion. Another potential application is using strong electric fields from petawatt laser pulses to drive steep density gradient structures in a plasma, which then creates field gradients capable of accelerating particles in a much shorter distance than linac; such concept is known as laser wakefield acceleration. In addition, as the laser pulse itself reaches extremely high field intensity, interaction of the high-energy particle beam with a petawatt laser pulse can achieve interactions with intensity beyond the Schwinger limit, enabling possible observation of effects such as vacuum polarization and Breit-Wheeler process.

Generation of a petawatt laser pulse requires the pulse duration to be extremely short: to reach 1 petawatt of power, a 1 joule laser pulse will require a duration of <1 fs (< 10^{−15} seconds). All petawatt systems (with the exception of the National Ignition Facility) use the technique of chirped pulse amplification, which amplifies chirped, temporally stretched laser pulses before compressing them into femtosecond, ultra-high intensity pulses. For laser systems with large pulse energies, Nd:glass is typically used as a gain medium, as they can be grown into very large crystals. For laser pulses with duration near the femtosecond range, Ti:Sapphire is widely used to take advantage of its wide lasing spectrum; only such lasers can be compressed into ultrashort pulses, due to Fourier relations between the temporal and spectral widths of the pulse signal.

== Petawatt lasers ==
The following list contains laser systems with petawatt-class peak power. Although there is not a precise definition for "petawatt-class" lasers, the list include all systems with peak power >=0.5 PW.

| Facility | Institution | Location | Classification | Pulse energy (J) | Pulse duration (fs) | Peak power (PW) | Status |
|---|---|---|---|---|---|---|---|
| Nova | Lawrence Livermore National Laboratory | United States | Nd:glass | 660 | 440 | 1.5 | Decommissioned |
| NIF-ARC | Lawrence Livermore National Laboratory | United States | Nd:glass | 400–1700 | 1300–38 000 | 1.5 | Operation |
| Texas Petawatt Laser | University of Texas, Austin | United States | Nd:glass | 186 | 167 | 1.1 | Suspended |
| Z-PW | Sandia National Laboratories | United States | Nd:glass | 500 | 500 | 1 | Operation |
| SG-II-PW | Shanghai Institute of Optics and Fine Mechanics, The Chinese Academy of Sciences (SIOM) | China | Nd:glass | 1000 | 1000 | 1 | Operation |
| Vulcan | Central Laser Facility, Rutherford Appleton Laboratory | United Kingdom | Nd:glass | 500 | 500 | 1 | Operation |
| Vulcan | Central Laser Facility, Rutherford Appleton Laboratory | United Kingdom | Optical Parametric Chirped Pulse Amplification (OPCPA) | 400 | 20 | 20 | Design |
| Orion | Atomic Weapons Establishment | United Kingdom | Nd:glass | 500 | 500 | 1 | Operation |
| PHELIX | GSI Helmholtz | Germany | Nd:glass | 250 | 400 | 0.625 | Operation |
| LMJ-PETAL | CEA Cesta | France | Nd:glass | 850 | 700 | 1.15 | Operation |
| GEKKO XII-LFEX | Osaka University | Japan | Nd:glass | 3000 | 1500 | 2 | Operation |
| ELI-B L4 | Extreme Light Infrastructure | Czech Republic | Nd:glass | 1500 | 150 | 10 | Commission |
| ELI-NP | Extreme Light Infrastructure | Romania | OPCPA; Ti:sapphire | 242 | 22.3 | 10.9 | Operation |
| ELI-B L3 HAPLS | Extreme Light Infrastructure; Lawrence Livermore National Laboratory | Czech Republic United States | Ti:sapphire | 30 | 30 | 1 at 10 Hz | Commission |
| ELI-ALPS HF | Extreme Light Infrastructure | Hungary | OPCPA | 34 | 17 | 2 at 10 Hz | Commission |
| Apollon | CNRS; École polytechnique | France | OPCPA; Ti:sapphire | 150 | 15 | 10 | Commission |
| DRACO | Helmholtz-Zentrum Dresden-Rossendorf | Germany | Ti:sapphire | 30 | 30 | 1 | Operation |
| ATLAS | Technical University of Munich; LMU Munich | Germany | Ti:sapphire | 60 | 25 | 2.4 at 1 Hz | Operation |
| PENELOPE | Helmholtz-Zentrum Dresden-Rossendorf | Germany | Yb:glass/CaF_{2} | 150 | 150 | 1 at 1 Hz | Construction |
| CETAL | INFLPR | Romania | Ti:sapphire | 25 | 25 | 1 | Operation |
| PEARL | Institute of Applied Physics, Russian Academy of Sciences | Russia | Ti:sapphire | 24 | 43 | 0.56 | Operation |
| PEARL | Institute of Applied Physics, Russian Academy of Sciences | Russia | OPCPA | | | 4 - 5 | Construction |
| VEGA-3 | University of Salamanca | Spain | Ti:sapphire | 30 | 30 | 1 at 1 Hz | Operation |
| Gemini | Central Laser Facility, Rutherford Appleton Laboratory | United Kingdom | Ti:sapphire | 15 | 30 | 0.5 | Operation |
| EPAC | Central Laser Facility, Rutherford Appleton Laboratory | United Kingdom | Ti:sapphire | 30 | 30 | 1 at 10 Hz | Construction |
| ALEPH | Colorado State University | United States | Ti:sapphire | 26 | 30 | 0.87 at 3.3 Hz | Operation |
| BELLA | Lawrence Berkeley National Laboratory | United States | Ti:sapphire | 40 | 30 | 1.3 | Operation |
| DIOCLES | University of Nebraska-Lincoln | United States | Ti:sapphire | 20 | 30 | 0.7 | Suspended |
| ZEUS | University of Michigan | United States | Ti:sapphire | 75 | 25 | 3 | Commission |
| ZEUS | University of Michigan | United States | Ti:sapphire | 12.5 | 25 | 0.5 | Commission |
| NSF OPAL | Laboratory for Laser Energetics, University of Rochester | United States | OPCPA | 550 | 20 | 25 | Design |
| XL-III | Institute of Physics, Chinese Academy of Science | China | Ti:sapphire | 32 | 28 | 1.16 | Operation |
| Huairou PW | Institute of Physics, Chinese Academy of Science | China | Ti:sapphire | 25 | 25 | 1 | Operation |
| CLAPA-II | Peking University | China | OPCPA; Ti:Sapphire | 60 | 30 | 2 | Commission |
| BAQIS PW | Tsinghua University | China | Ti:sapphire | 30 | 30 | 1 at 1 Hz | Commission |
| CAEP-PW | China Academy of Engineering Physics | China | OPCPA | 91.1 | 18.6 | 4.9 | Operation |
| SULF | SIOM; ShanghaiTech University | China | Ti:sapphire | 216 | 21 | 10.3 | Operation |
| TDLI LAP | Shanghai Jiao Tong University | China | Ti:sapphire | 80 | 22 | 2.5 | Construction |
| SG-II-5 PW | SIOM | China | OPCPA | 150 | 30 | 5 | Construction |
| SEL-100 PW | Shanghai High Repetition Rate XEFL and Extreme Light Facility | China | OPCPA | 1500 | 15 | 100 | Construction |
| CoReLS | Centre for Relativistic Laser Science, Institute for Basic Science | South Korea | Ti:sapphire | 83 | 19.4 | 4.2 | Operation |
| J-KAREN | National Institutes for Quantum Science and Technology | Japan | OPCPA; Ti:sapphire | 28/30 | 33/30 | 0.85/1 | Operation |
| RRCAT | Raja Ramanna Centre for Advanced Technology | India | Ti:sapphire | 25 | 25 | 1 at 0.1 Hz | Operation |
| TRISHUL | Tata Institute of Fundamental Research Hyderabad | India | Ti:sapphire | 25 | 25 | 1 at 1 Hz | Installation |

== High average power lasers ==
A number of petawatt or sub-petawatt laser systems are notable for being capable of operating at high repetition rates (HRR). These laser systems are high average power (HAP) lasers, delivering high power when averaged over macroscopic time scale yet still maintaining terawatt or petawatt peak power within a single pulse. HAP petawatt lasers are crucial for any future applications of petawatt laser systems such as compact light sources, next-generation accelerators, or proton source for radiotherapy; in scientific research facilities, they also greatly improve experiment efficiency by enabling a much large set of experimental data to be collected within the same amount of beam time. On the other hand, designing and operating petawatt laser systems at high repetition rate presents an immense engineering challenge, as the laser system must handle large amounts of excessive heat when pumped at a much higher frequency as well as thermal effects that degrades beam quality. In recent years, advances in high-power laser technology, such as pumping schemes, pump light sources, and cryogenic cooling, led to the emergence of a new class of HAP laser systems.

The following list includes laser systems with peak power of at least 100 TW and average power of at least 100 W. Some lasers in the list are already petawatt-class lasers.

| Facility | Institution | Location | Classification | Pulse energy (J) | Pulse duration (fs) | Peak power (PW) | Repetition rate (Hz) | Average power (kW) | Status |
|---|---|---|---|---|---|---|---|---|---|
| ELI-B L2 DUHA | Extreme Light Infrastructure | Czech Republic | OPCPA | 3 | 25 | 0.12 | 50 | 0.15 | Commission |
| ELI-B L3 HAPLS | Extreme Light Infrastructure; Lawrence Livermore National Laboratory | Czech Republic United States | Ti:sapphire | 30 | 30 | 1 | 10 | 0.3 | Commission |
| ELI-ALPS HF | Extreme Light Infrastructure | Hungary | OPCPA | 34 | 17 | 2 | 10 | 0.34 | Commission |
| LAPLACE-HC | Laboratoire d'optique appliquée | France | Ti:Sapphire | 1 | 25 | 0.04 | 100 | 0.1 | Construction |
| PENELOPE | Helmholtz-Zentrum Dresden-Rossendorf | Germany | Yb:glass/CaF_{2} | 150 | 150 | 1 | 1 | 0.15 | Construction |
| KALDERA | DESY | Germany | Ti:sapphire | 3 | 30 | 0.1 | 1000 | 3 | Construction |
| EPAC | Central Laser Facility, Rutherford Appleton Laboratory | United Kingdom | Ti:sapphire | 30 | 30 | 1 | 10 | 0.3 | Construction |
| k-BELLA | Lawrence Berkeley National Laboratory | United States | Ti:sapphire | 3 | 30 | 0.1 | 1000 | 3 | Design |
| SHARC | LCLS-II; Lawrence Livermore National Laboratory | United States | Nd:glass | 150 | 150 | 1 | 10 | 1.5 | Design |

== Gallery ==
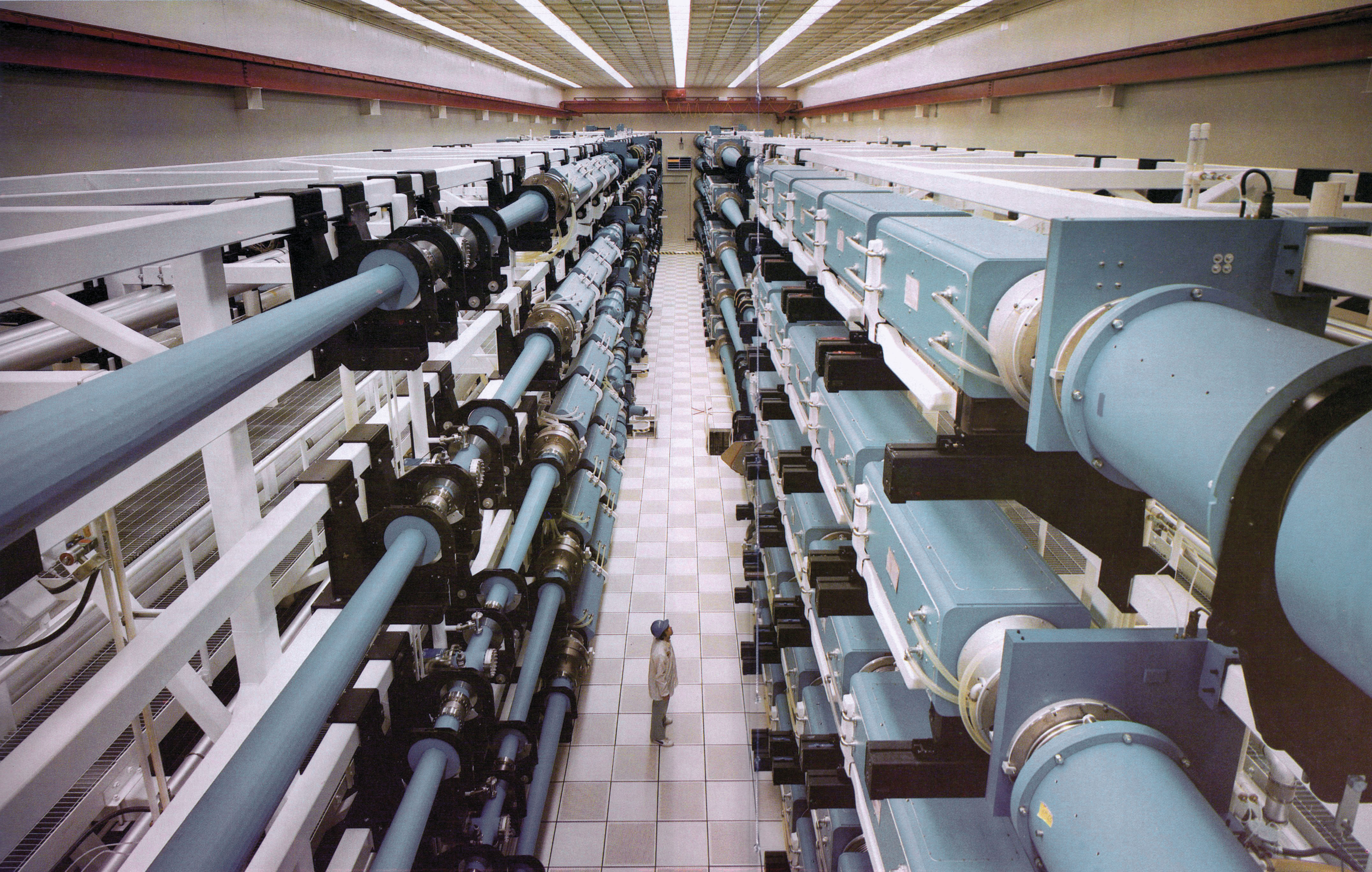
NOVA, the first petawatt class laser, at Lawrence Livermore National Laboratory, USA

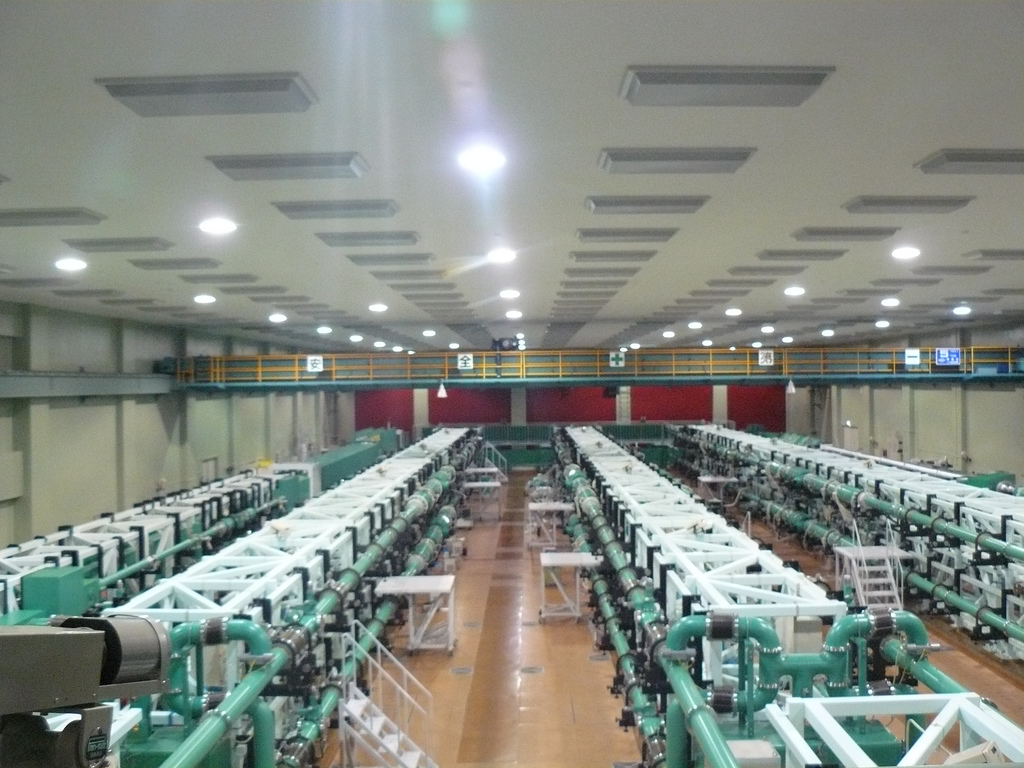
The GEKKO XII laser at Osaka University, Japan

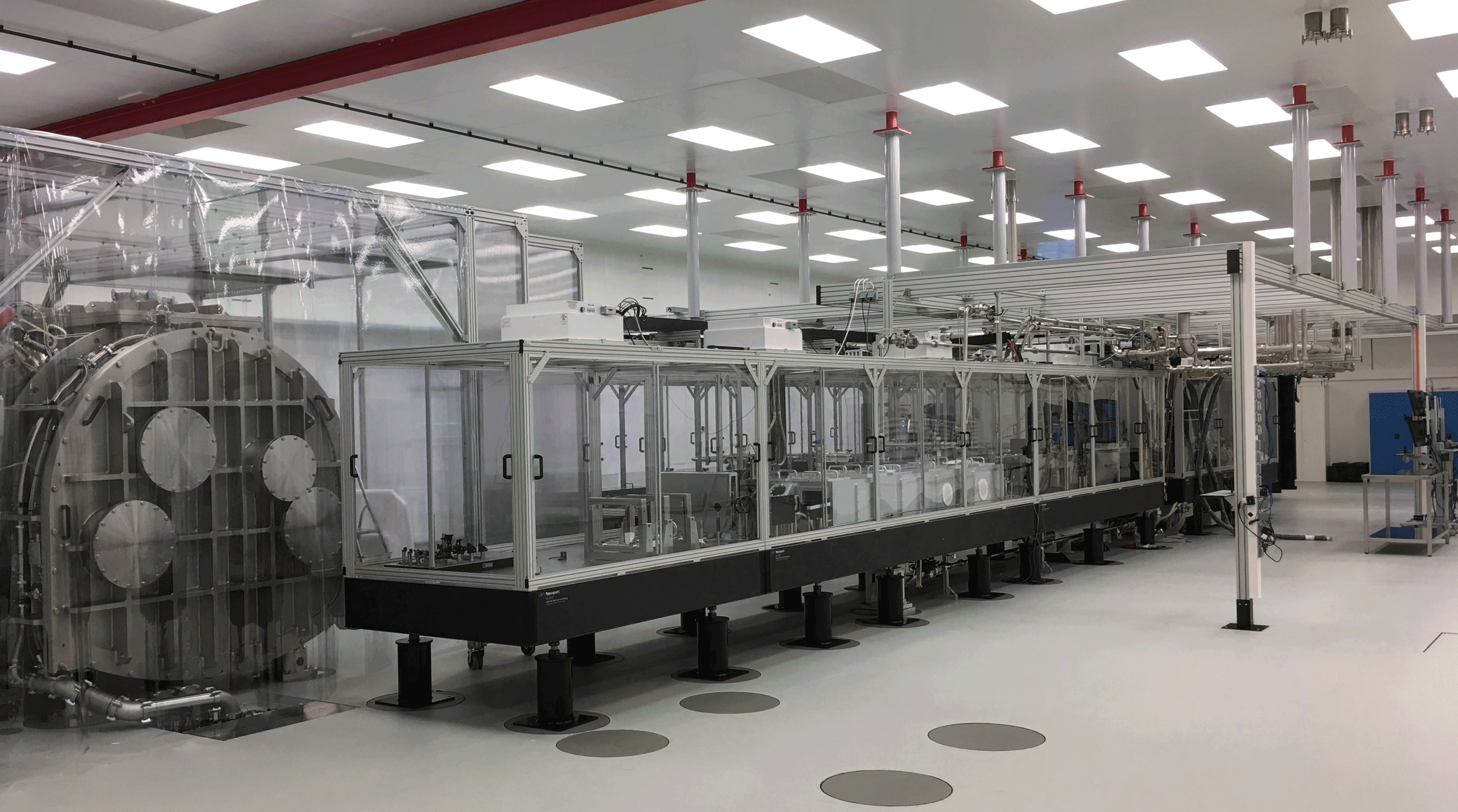
The L3 HAPLS system at ELI Beamline, Czech Republic

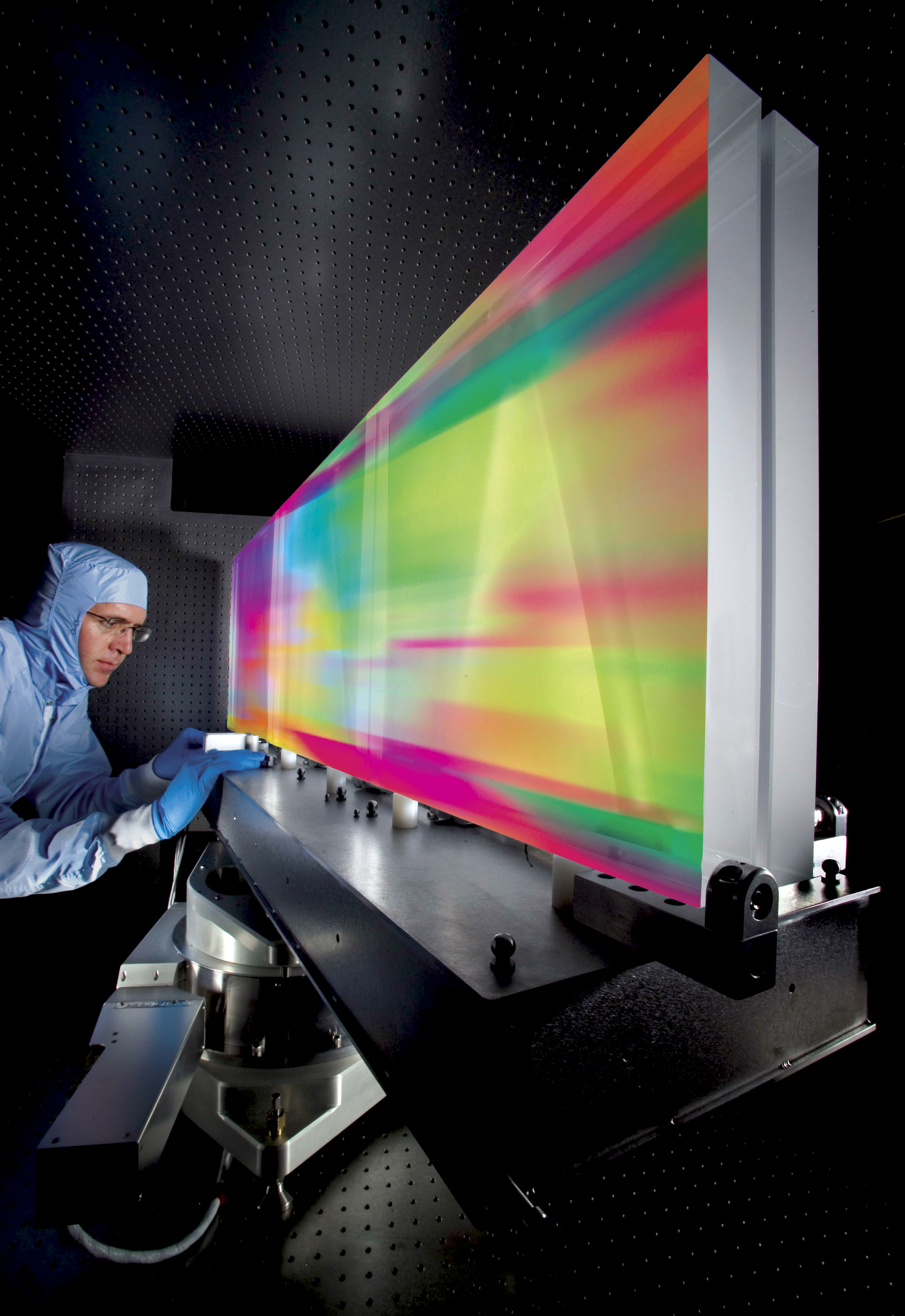
Diffraction grating of the OMEGA EP laser, showing colors reflected from multilayer dielectric coating (MLD)

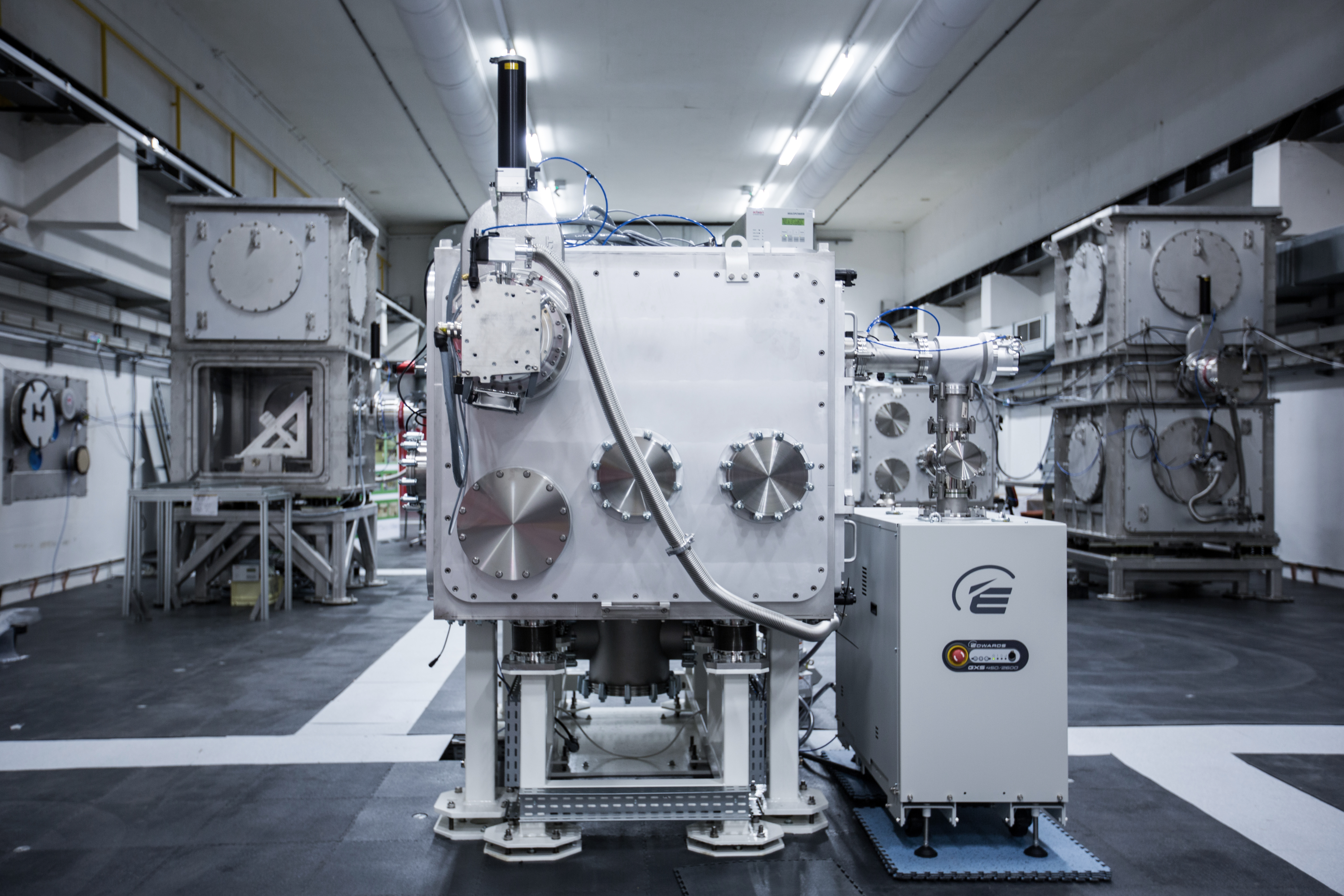
A picture showing the interaction chamber of the Apollon laser during commission

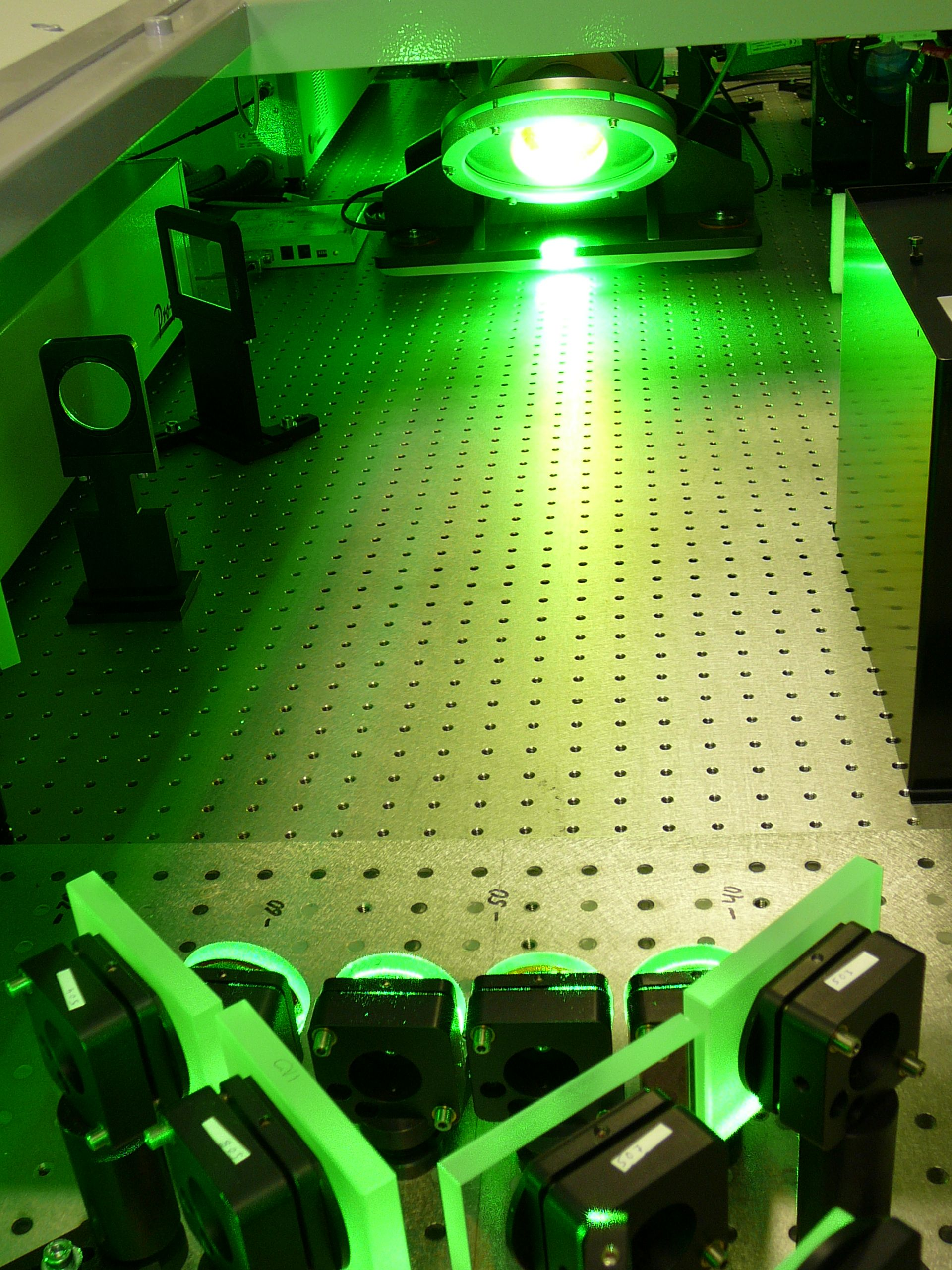
A multi-pass amplifier of the DRACO laser at Helmholtz-Zentrum Dresden-Rossendorf, Germany

== See also ==
- Thales Group
- Amplitude Lasers
