= Orion (laser) =

Laser facility in the United Kingdom

Coordinates: 51.36°N 1.14°W

The Orion Laser Facility (also known as the Orion Laser) is a high power laser facility based at the Atomic Weapons Establishment (AWE) on the former RAF Aldermaston site in the United Kingdom.

Construction of Orion began in 2006 and its first shot was fired in 2010. The building houses a large neodymium glass laser system and a target chamber, and it is the biggest experimental facility of high-energy density physics in the UK.

Orion delivers 10 "long-pulse" one-nanosecond duration beams and two petawatt (PW) "short-pulse" 0.5 picosecond duration beams. The facility also provides a comprehensive suite of optical, particle, and x-ray plasma diagnostics to understand the plasma conditions created through the laser interaction.

Orion plays a key role in AWE’s core mission to support the safety, reliability and performance of nuclear warheads throughout their lifecycle under the UK's ratification of the Comprehensive Test Ban Treaty (CTBT), which bans live testing. It can replicate the extreme temperatures, pressures and densities found at the heart of a nuclear explosion for the study and understand the physics phenomena that occur in these environments.

Orion also dedicates a proportion of its time for collaborative academic research in the UK and internationally, which is managed through an academic peer-review process by the Central Laser Facility at the Rutherford Appleton Laboratory. Academic research ranges from the conditions relevant to inertial fusion energy, planetary and solar physics, high-energy particle acceleration, black holes and much more.

== History ==
AWE (formally AWRE, the Atomic Weapons Research Establishment) is a Ministry of Defence research facility. It plays a key role in the UK’s nuclear defence through its extensive stockpile stewardship programme, testing the reliability of and maintaining the country’s nuclear weapons without the use of nuclear testing under the era of the CTBT. AWRE came under the Ministry of Defence control in 1973, and merged with two Royal Ordnance Factories to form the Atomic Weapons Establishment in 1987.

AWRE were early players in the research and development of lasers in the UK. It set up its High-Power Laser Group in 1962 to investigate a broad range of lasers and associated high-power technology that could be relevant the AWRE programme. The potential of lasers for stockpile stewardship was realised in the 1970s by AWRE scientist Brian Thomas, who postulated their ability to measure less well-understood aspects of radiation hydrodynamics and material properties. Thus began the application of laser techniques in the AWRE programme.

Investment into high-power lasers continued as part of the UK's commitment to be a responsible nuclear weapons state, continuing safety and stockpile stewardship. It was essential for AWRE to own in-house laser capability and construction of HELEN (High Energy Laser Embodying Neodymium), Orion’s predecessor, was completed 1976. The facility was operational for nearly thirty years before being replaced.

Many possibilities were considered to succeed HELEN, but the experimental conditions required for the various experimental interests of AWE and the laser parameters required to deliver them played a key role in justifying Orion’s development.

Furthermore, the development of Chirped Pulse Amplification, a technique to amplify picosecond laser pulses up to the PW level, enabled the design of an affordable ultra-high-power laser facility able to reach relevant conditions for such experiments, whilst offering potential for collaboration.

AWE conducted feasibility studies of the Orion design between 2003 and 2004, and was given approval by the Ministry of Defence in 2005. The formal project, including construction, installation, and initial demonstration phase, was completed in 2010 within its budget of £170 million. Orion became fully operational in 2013.

== Description ==
Orion can deliver up to 10 "long-pulse" beams, each delivering 500 J at 351 nm in one nanosecond with flexible pulse-shaping, and two "short-pulse" beams, each delivering up to 500 J at 1053 nm in half a picosecond (1 PW). These beams are focussed on a target within Orion's 4-metre-diameter (13 ft) vacuum chamber. This dual pulse design enables the compression of a target with the long-pulse beams, target heating with one short pulse and diagnosis with the second short pulse. Orion also contains an extensive suite of optical, X-ray, charged-particle and neutron diagnostics, many of which are deployable in diagnostic insertion devices.

Orion operates under a "shot director" model, where one person is responsible for all aspects of the laser shot. This enables greater level of oversight and control of operations to ensure the beams are delivered to target safely and precisely.

Orion has also been upgraded to meet user demands. The duration of the "long pulse" beams has been extended from 5 to 10 ns, with an option to delay beamlines relative to reach other. One of the short pulse beamlines is frequency-doubled (at reduced aperture) to give increased contrast, allowing Orion to generate ~200 TW pulses with a contrast of ~10^{18}, the highest contrast of any facility worldwide.

== Research ==
While the primary use of Orion is under the AWE mission for nuclear stockpile stewardship under the CTBT, research at the facility spans across many disciplines, from materials science and plasma physics to the development of techniques to improve our understanding of laser science.

The facility also dedicates up to 15% of its time to academic research. Academic access to Orion is arranged through a peer-review process, managed through the Central Laser Facility’s High Power Laser Facility Access Panel. Orion is also part of Laserlab-Europe, an initiative to give the European research community access to laser facilities across the continent and engage in collaborative technology development.

AWE coordinates a number of scientific collaborations across the UK and internationally. For example, it hosts a close partnership with the University of Oxford’s research group, the Oxford Centre for High Energy Density Science (OxCHEDS), which studies matter under extreme temperatures and pressure conditions. As well as gaining access to the Orion laser at AWE, OxCHEDS also benefits from AWE-sponsorship of a number of students and academics within the research group. A similar arrangement can be found with Imperial College London's Plasma Physics Group for experiments in areas such as radiative astrophysical shock studies.

Other collaborations include those with advanced laser facilities in the world, for example the National Ignition Facility in the US and the Vulcan Laser Facility at the Central Laser Facility.

== See also ==
- Central Laser Facility
- Rutherford Appleton Laboratory
- Dstl
- Lawrence Livermore National Laboratory
- National Ignition Facility
- Extreme Light Infrastructure
- Shiva Laser
- Nova Laser
- List of laser types
