= Ultrashort pulse laser =

Laser capable of delivering picosecond (10^-12 s) pulses of light

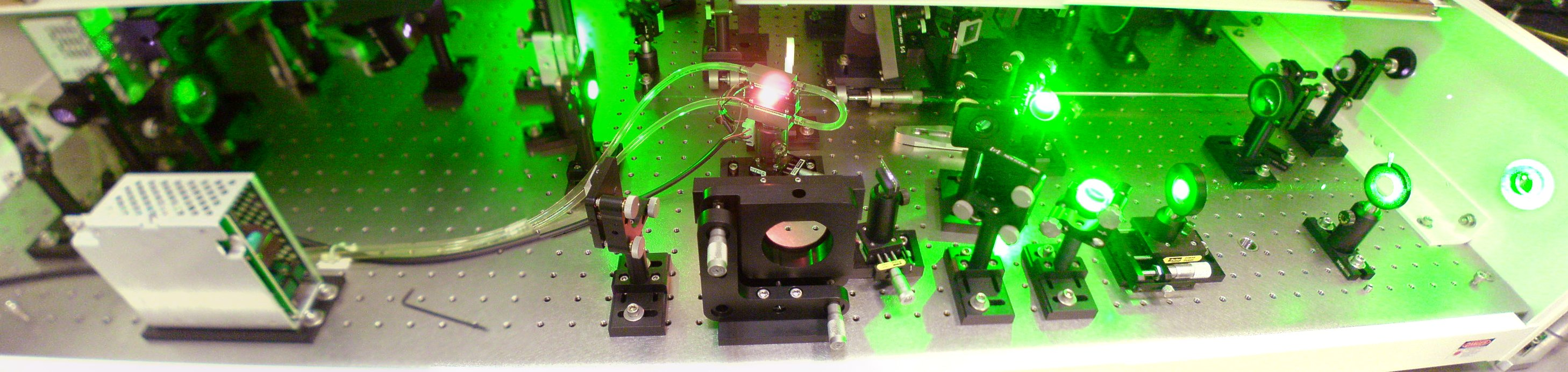
Ultrashort Ti:sapphire pulse amplifier ODIN

An ultrashort pulse laser is a laser that emits ultrashort pulses of light, generally of the order of femtoseconds to one picosecond. They are also known as ultrafast lasers owing to the speed at which pulses "turn on" and "off"—not to be confused with the speed at which light propagates, which is determined by the properties of the medium (and has an upper limit), particularly its index of refraction, and can vary as a function of field intensity (i.e. self-phase modulation) and wavelength (chromatic dispersion).

Common current ultrashort pulse laser technologies include Ti-sapphire lasers and dye lasers. High output peak power usually requires chirped pulse amplification of a seed pulse from a modelocked laser. Dealing with high optical powers also needs the nonlinear optical phenomena to be taken in account.

== Use in pathogen inactivation ==
Tsen and colleagues developed a SEPHODIS (selective photonic disinfection) technology using an ultrashort pulse laser to kill viruses including HIV, influenza virus, and noroviruses. The technique appears to damage viral capsids while preserving other proteins and biological materials, although these claims have been disputed elsewhere. The ultrashort pulse laser treatment may have potential applications in the disinfection of medicines, in the production of inactivated vaccines, and in the possible future treatment of blood-borne viral infections from agents such as HIV and Ebola virus.

== See also ==
- Optical parametric amplification
- List of petawatt lasers
- List of laser articles
