= Plasma acceleration =

Charged particle acceleration technique

Plasma acceleration is a technique for accelerating charged particles, such as electrons or ions, using the electric field associated with an electron plasma wave or other high-gradient plasma structures. These structures are created using either ultra-short laser pulses or high energy particle beams that are matched to the plasma parameters. The technique offers a way to build affordable and compact particle accelerators.

Fully developed, the technology could replace many of the traditional accelerators with applications ranging from high energy physics to medical and industrial applications. Medical applications include betatron and free-electron light sources for diagnostics or radiation therapy and proton sources for hadron therapy.

== History ==
The basic concepts of plasma acceleration and its possibilities were conceived by Toshiki Tajima and John M. Dawson of UCLA in 1979. The initial experimental designs for a "wakefield" accelerator were developed at UCLA by Chandrashekhar J. Joshi et al.

The Texas Petawatt laser facility at the University of Texas at Austin accelerated electrons to 2 GeV over about 2 cm (1.6×10^{21} g_{n}). This record was broken in 2014 by the scientists at the BELLA Center at the Lawrence Berkeley National Laboratory, when they produced electron beams up to 4.25 GeV.

In late 2014, researchers from SLAC National Accelerator Laboratory using the Facility for Advanced Accelerator Experimental Tests (FACET) published proof of the viability of plasma acceleration technology, showing that it could produce 400 to 500 times higher energy transfer compared to a general linear accelerator design.

The AWAKE proof-of-principle wakefield accelerator experiment using a 400 GeV proton beam from the Super Proton Synchrotron has operated at CERN since the end of 2016.

In August 2020 scientists demonstrated the longest stable operation of 30 continuous hours.

== Concept ==
=== Wakefield acceleration ===
A plasma is a fluid of positive and negative charged particles, generally created by heating or photoionizing a dilute gas. Under normal conditions the plasma is macroscopically neutral (or quasi-neutral), an equal mix of electrons and ions in equilibrium. However, if a sufficient external electric or electromagnetic field is applied, the plasma electrons, which are much lighter than the background ions (by a factor of 1836), separate spatially, creating a charge imbalance in the perturbed region. A particle injected into such a plasma is accelerated by the charge separation field, but since the magnitude of this separation is generally similar to that of the external field, nothing is gained in comparison to a conventional system that simply applies the field directly to the particle. However, the plasma medium is the most efficient known transformer of the transverse field of an electromagnetic wave into longitudinal fields of a plasma wave. In existing accelerator technology various materials are used to convert transversely propagating fields into longitudinal fields that can kick the particles. This process is achieved using two approaches: standing-wave structures (such as resonant cavities) or traveling-wave structures such as disc-loaded waveguides. Materials interacting with higher and higher fields eventually get destroyed through ionization and breakdown. Plasma acceleration can generate, sustain, and exploit the strongest fields ever produced in the laboratory.

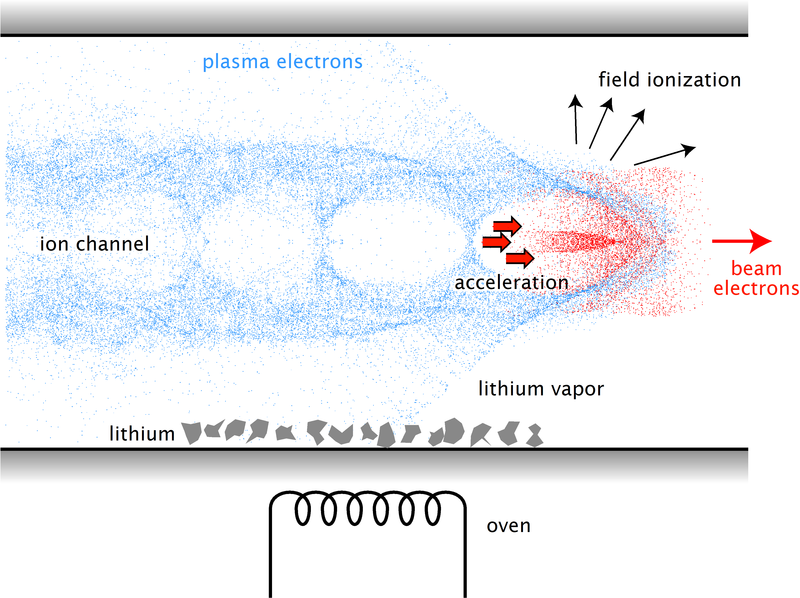
Wake created by an electron beam in a plasma

The acceleration gradient produced by a plasma wake is in the order of the wave breaking field, which is

$$E_0 = \sqrt{\frac{m_e n_e c^2}{\varepsilon_0}}.$$

In this equation, $E_0$ is the electric field, $c$ is the speed of light in vacuum, $m_e$ is the mass of the electron, $n_e$ is the plasma electron density (in particles per unit volume), and $\varepsilon_0$ is the permittivity of free space.

What makes the system useful is the possibility of introducing waves of high charge separation that propagate through the plasma similar to the traveling-wave concept in conventional accelerators. The accelerator thereby phase-locks a particle bunch on a wave and this wave accelerates them to higher velocities while retaining the bunch properties. Plasma wakes can be excited by appropriately shaped laser pulses or electron bunches. Plasma electrons are driven out and away from the center of wake by the ponderomotive force or the electrostatic fields from the exciting fields (electron or laser). Plasma ions are too massive to move significantly and are effectively stationary at the time-scales of plasma electron response. As the exciting fields pass through the plasma, the plasma electrons experience a massive attractive force toward the center of the wake by the positive plasma ions chamber, bubble or column that have remained positioned there, as they were originally in the unexcited plasma. This forms a full wake of an extremely high longitudinal (accelerating) and transverse (focusing) electric field. The positive charge from ions in the charge-separation region then creates a huge gradient between the back of the wake (many electrons), and the middle of the wake (mostly ions). Electrons between these two areas will be accelerated (in self-injection mechanism). In the external bunch injection schemes, the electrons are strategically injected to arrive at the evacuated region during maximum excursion or expulsion of the plasma electrons.

A beam-driven wake can be created by sending a relativistic proton or electron bunch into an appropriate plasma or gas. In some cases, the gas can be ionized by the electron bunch, so that the electron bunch creates both the plasma and the wake. This requires an electron bunch with relatively high charge and thus strong fields. The high fields of the electron bunch then push the plasma electrons out from the center, creating the wake.

Similar to a beam-driven wake, a laser pulse can be used to excite the wake. As the pulse travels through the plasma, the electric field of the light separates the electrons and nucleons in the same way that an external field would.

If the fields are strong enough, all of the ionized plasma electrons can be removed from the center of the wake: this is known as the "blowout regime". Although the particles are not then moving quickly, macroscopically it appears that a "bubble" of charge is moving through the plasma at close to the speed of light. The bubble is the region cleared of electrons that is thus positively charged, followed by the region where the electrons fall back into the center and is thus negatively charged. This leads to a small area of very strong potential gradient trailing the laser pulse.

In the linear regime, plasma electrons aren't completely removed from the center of the wake. In this case, the linear plasma wave equation can be applied. However, the wake appears similar to the blowout regime, and the physics of acceleration is the same.

It is this "wakefield" that is used for particle acceleration. A particle injected into the plasma near the high-density area will experience an acceleration toward (or away) from it, an acceleration that continues as the wakefield travels through the column, until the particle eventually reaches the speed of the wakefield. Even higher energies can be reached by injecting the particle to travel across the face of the wakefield, much like a surfer can travel at speeds much higher than the wave they surf on by traveling across it. Accelerators designed to take advantage of this technique have been referred to colloquially as "surfatrons".

Wakefield acceleration can be categorized into several types according to how the electron plasma wave is formed:

- plasma wakefield acceleration (PWFA): The electron plasma wave is formed by an electron or proton bunch.
- laser wakefield acceleration (LWFA): A laser pulse is introduced to form an electron plasma wave.
- laser beat-wave acceleration (LBWA): The electron plasma wave arises based on different frequency generation of two laser pulses. The surfatron is an improvement on this technique.
- self-modulated laser wakefield acceleration (SMLWFA): The formation of an electron plasma wave is achieved by a laser pulse modulated by stimulated Raman forward scattering instability.

Experiments
Type of acceleration	Experiments
Laser wakefield acceleration	BELLA, TREX, CLF, LUX
Plasma wakefield acceleration using electrons	FACET, FACET II, DESY FLASHForward
Plasma wakefield acceleration using positrons	FACET, FACET II
Plasma wakefield acceleration using protons	AWAKE

=== Target normal sheath acceleration ===
Laser–solid-target-based ion acceleration has become an active area of research, especially since the discovery of the target normal sheath acceleration (TNSA). This new scheme offers further improvements in hadrontherapy, fusion fast ignition and sources for fundamental research. Nonetheless, the maximum energies achieved so far with this scheme are in the order of 100 MeV energies.

The main laser-solid acceleration scheme is Target Normal Sheath Acceleration, TNSA as it is usually referred as. TNSA like other laser based acceleration techniques is not capable of directly accelerating the ions. Instead it is a multi-step process consisting of several stages each with its associated difficulty to model mathematically. For this reason, so far there exists no perfect theoretical model capable of producing quantitative predictions for the TNSA mechanism. Particle-in-cell simulations are usually employed to efficiently achieve predictions.

The scheme employs a solid target that interacts firstly with the laser prepulse, this ionises the target turning it into a plasma and causing a pre-expansion of the target front. Which produces an underdense plasma region at the front of the target, the so-called preplasma. Once the main laser pulse arrives at the target front it will then propagate through this underdense region and be reflected from the front surface of the target propagating back through the preplasma. Throughout this process the laser has heated up the electrons in the underdense region and accelerated them via stochastic heating. This heating process is incredibly important, producing a high temperature electron populations is key for the next steps of the process. The importance of the preplasma in the electron heating process has recently been studied both theoretically and experimentally showing how longer preplasmas lead to stronger electron heating and an enhancement in TNSA. The hot electrons propagate through the solid target and exit it through the rear end. In doing so, the electrons produce an incredibly strong electric field, in the order of TV/m, through charge separation. This electric field, also referred to as the sheath field due to its resemblance with the shape of a sheath from a sword, is responsible for the acceleration of the ions. On the rear face of the target there is a small layer of contaminants (usually light hydrocarbons and water vapor). These contaminants are ionised by the strong electric field generated by the hot electrons and then accelerated. Which leads to an energetic ion beam and completes the acceleration process.

Responsible for the spiky, fast ion front of the expanding plasma is an ion wave breaking process that takes place in the initial phase of the evolution and is described by the Sack-Schamel equation.

== Comparison with RF acceleration ==
The advantage of plasma acceleration is that its acceleration field can be much stronger than that of conventional radio-frequency (RF) accelerators. In RF accelerators, the field has an upper limit determined by the threshold for dielectric breakdown of the acceleration tube. This limits the amount of acceleration over any given length, requiring very long accelerators to reach high energies. In contrast, the maximum field in a plasma is defined by mechanical qualities and turbulence, but is generally several orders of magnitude stronger than with RF accelerators. It is hoped that a compact particle accelerator can be created based on plasma acceleration techniques or accelerators for much higher energy can be built, if long accelerators are realizable with an accelerating field of 10 GV/m.

Current experimental devices show accelerating gradients several orders of magnitude better than current particle accelerators over very short distances, and about one order of magnitude better (1 GeV/m vs 0.1 GeV/m for an RF accelerator) at the one meter scale.

For example, an experimental laser plasma accelerator at Lawrence Berkeley National Laboratory accelerates electrons to 1 GeV over about 3.3 cm (5.4×10^{20} g_{n}), and one conventional accelerator (highest electron energy accelerator) at SLAC requires 64 m to reach the same energy. Similarly, using plasmas an energy gain of more than 40 GeV was achieved using the SLAC SLC beam (42 GeV) in just 85 cm using a plasma wakefield accelerator (8.9×10^{20} g_{n}).

== Application ==
In the framework of HORIZON 2020 which is the Framework Programmes for Research and Technological Development the Conceptual Design Report of EuPRAXIA project "(European Plasma Research Accelerator with eXcellence In Applications") was worked out by 74 scientific institutes. To find out which will be the most suitable technology, laserdriven (laser wakefield acceleration, LWFA), electron beam-driven (plasma wakefield acceleration, PWFA) as well as hybrid (combining LWFA and PWFA) acceleration approaches are under consideration. The beam-driven plasma wakefield acceleration facility will be built in the INFN National Laboratory of Frascati (LNF) near Rome in Italy. The second site of laser-driven (laser wakefield acceleration, LWFA) facility is however till undecided. Decision will be made in mid 2025.

== See also ==
- Dielectric wall accelerator
- List of petawatt lasers
