= Măgurele =

- Town
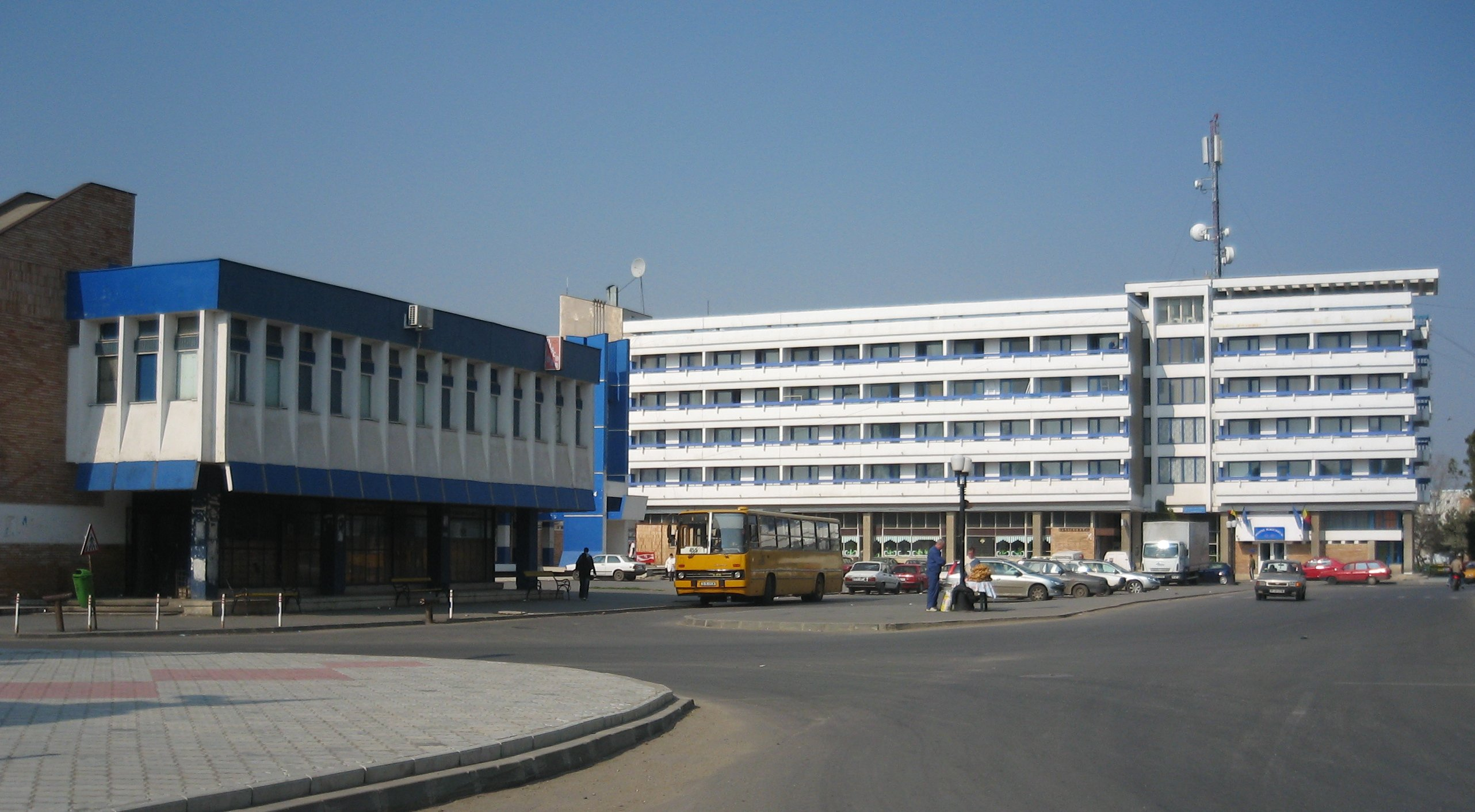
- Downtown Măgurele, 2007

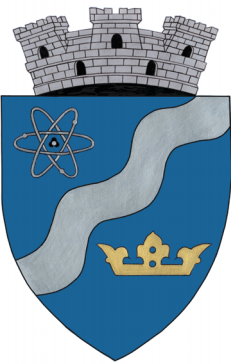
- Coat of arms

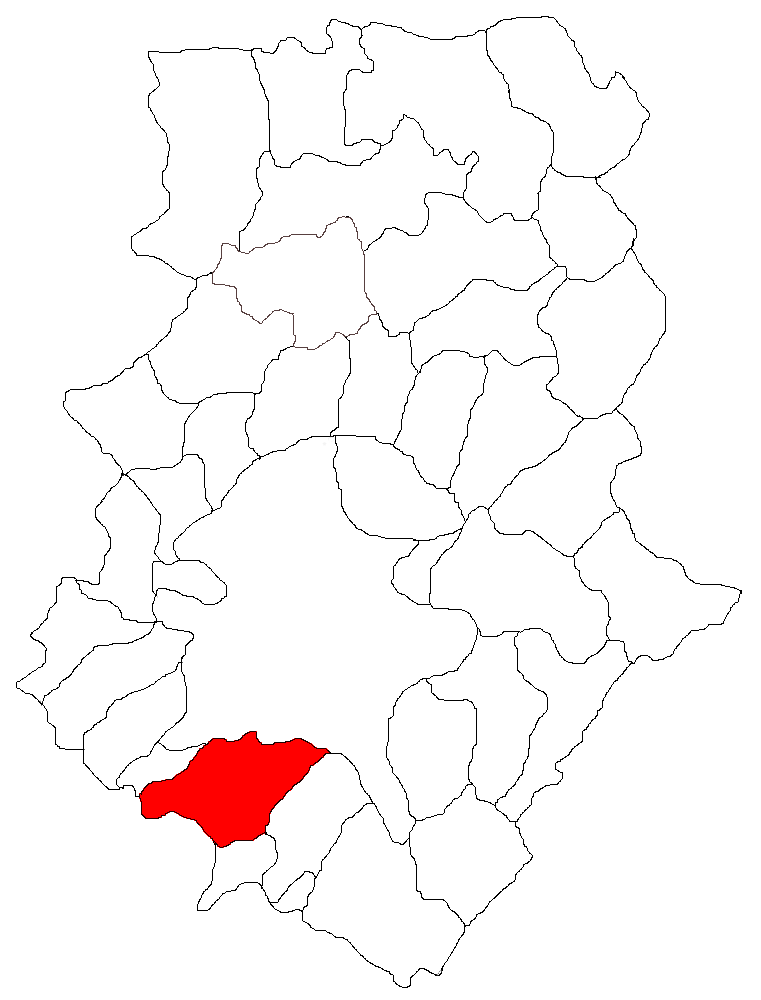
- Location in Ilfov County

- Location in Romania
- Coordinates: 44°20′58″N 26°01′47″E
- Country: Romania
- County: Ilfov

Government
  - Mayor (2024–2028): Narcis-Cătălin Constantin (PNL)
- Area: 45 km^{2} (17 sq mi)
- Elevation: 78 m (256 ft)
- Population (2021-12-01): 14,414
  - Density: 320/km^{2} (830/sq mi)
- Time zone: UTC+02:00 (EET)
  - Summer (DST): UTC+03:00 (EEST)
- Postal code: 077125
- Area code: (+40) 02 1
- Vehicle reg.: IF
- Website: primariamagurele.ro

Măgurele is a town situated in the southwestern part of Ilfov County, Muntenia, Romania. It has a population of 14,414 as of 2021 and hosts several research institutes.

In 2024, new buses were donated from the Voluntari district. It is rapidly developing. Examples include investment into education in Vârteju, construction of a new water supply and sewage collection network in Măgurele, and 85 households in Aluniș, connected to the water and sewage network.

== Research institutes ==
Although a small town, Măgurele hosts 9 different research institutes, on the naukograd model:

- Horia Hulubei National Institute for R&D in Physics and Nuclear Engineering (NIPNE/IFIN-HH) nipne.ro
  - Extreme Light Infrastructure - Nuclear Physics (ELI-NP) www.eli-np.ro
- National Institute for Laser, Plasma and Radiation Physics (INFLPR) inflpr.ro
- National Institute of Materials Physics (NIMP) infim.ro
- Institute of Atomic Physics (IFA) ifa-mg.ro
- National Institute of R&D for Optoelectronics (INOE 2000) inoe.ro
- National Institute for Earth Physics (NIEP/INCDFP) infp.ro
- National Institute of Research and Development in Mechatronics and Measurement Technique (INCDMTM) incdmtm.ro
- National Research&Development Institute for Non-ferrous and Rare Metals (IMNR) imnr.ro
- Research and Development National Institute for Metals and Radioactive Resources (INCDMRR-ICPMRR) incdmrr.ro

The town hosts Măgurele Science Park, the largest science park in Romania, consisting of a series o research institutes. among which a nuclear research lab, the Institute of Atomic Physics (IFA) and its National Institute for Physics and Nuclear Engineering (IFIN-HH). Between 1957 and 1998, it had a Soviet VVRS research reactor, now closed down. The Faculty of Physics of the University of Bucharest is also located in Măgurele.

According to a Romanian government press release, the high power laser system (HPLS) project of the Extreme Light Infrastructure — Nuclear Physics Center achieved the power of 10 petawatts on 7 March 2019, becoming the most powerful laser in the world.

== Administration ==
Historical population
| Year | Pop. | ±% |
|---|---|---|
| 2002 | 9,200 | — |
| 2011 | 11,041 | +20.0% |
| 2021 | 14,414 | +30.5% |
Source: Census data

Măgurele was declared a town in 2004. At the 2021 census it had a population of 14,414. Four villages are administered by the town: Alunișu, Dumitrana, Pruni, and Vârteju. Through the town, the following STV or STB lines pass: 426, going to Pruni, 464, going to Vârteju, 427, going to Dărăști-Ilfov, 428, going to Progresu and 487, going to ELI-NP. Before 2019, there was "Taxi-Maxi", so many such lines that reportedly one passed by every 2 minutes. One of the line's number was 203. In communist era, there was only one line, starting at Măgurele Center.

The local administration releases the monthly Pro Măgurele newspaper.

== Etymology ==
Its name is derived from a Romanian word possibly of Dacian origin, măgură, meaning "hill".

== Natives ==
- George Anania (1941–2013), science-fiction writer and translator
- Augustin Deleanu (1944–2014), footballer
