= Selective photonic disinfection =

Selective photonic disinfection (SEPHODIS) is an ultrashort pulse laser technology invented by Tsen and colleagues to combat pathogens including viruses and bacteria. SEPHODIS uses extremely brief pulses of light to destroy viral capsids while minimizing collateral damage to human cells and proteins. The technology is being developed as a defense system to rapidly produce vaccines against emerging pathogens, and as a method to safeguard the blood supply.
