= Donna Strickland =

Canadian physicist, engineer, and Nobel laureate

Donna Strickland CC FRS FRSC HonFInstP
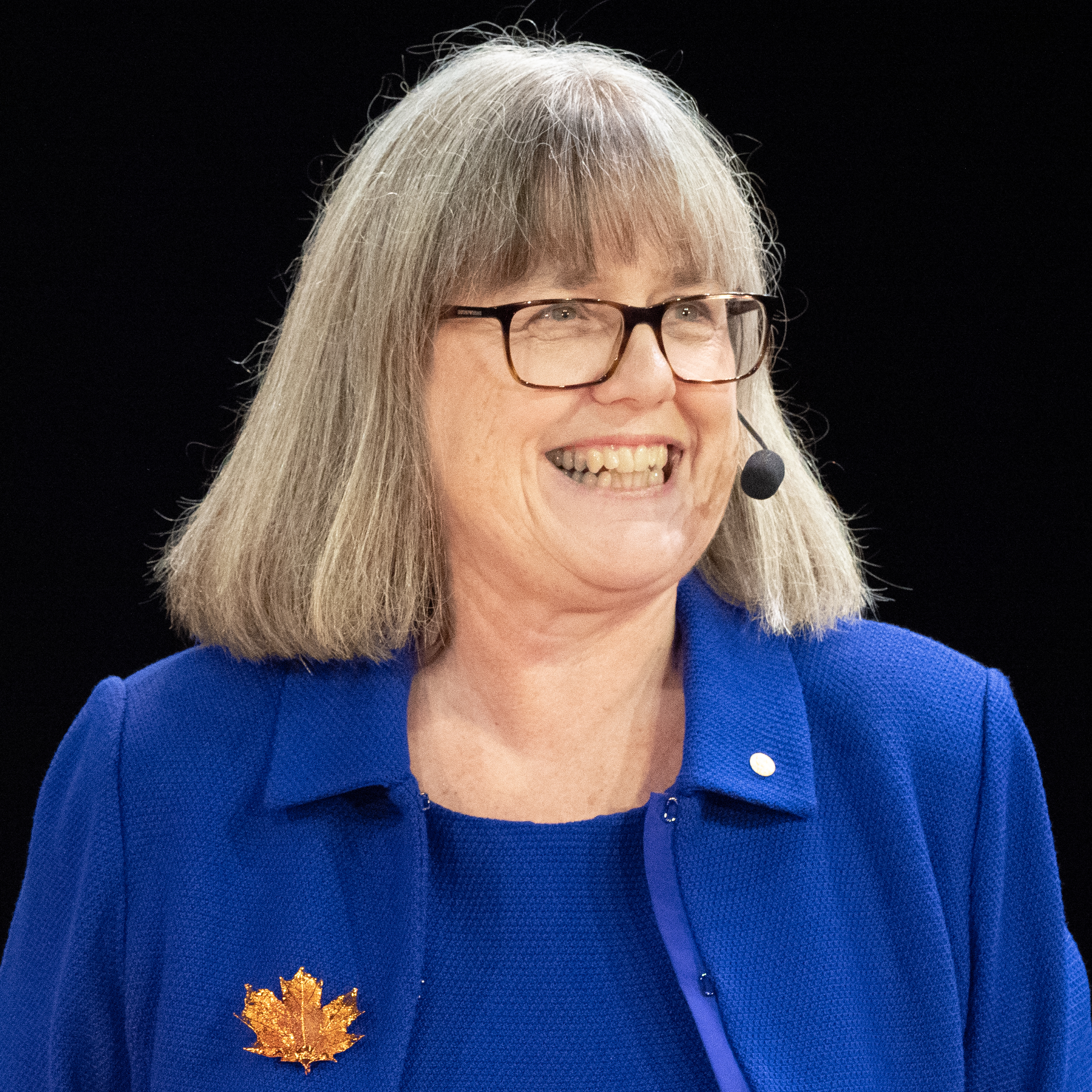
- Strickland in 2018
- Born: Donna Theo Strickland; 27 May 1959 (age 67); Guelph, Ontario, Canada
- Spouse: Doug Dykaar
- Awards: Nobel Prize in Physics (2018)

Scholarly background
- Education: McMaster University (B.Eng.); University of Rochester (PhD)
- Thesis: Development of an Ultra-Bright Laser and an Application to Multi-photon Ionization (1988)
- Doctoral advisor: Gérard Mourou

Scholarly work
- Discipline: Physics
- Sub-discipline: Optics
- Institutions: National Research Council of Canada; Lawrence Livermore National Laboratory; Princeton University; University of Waterloo
- Main interests: Intense laser–matter interactions; nonlinear optics; short-pulse intense laser systems; chirped pulse amplification; ultrafast optics

Donna Theo Strickland (born May 27, 1959) is a Canadian optical physicist and pioneer in the field of pulsed lasers. She was awarded the Nobel Prize in Physics in 2018, together with Gérard Mourou, for the practical implementation of chirped pulse amplification. She is a professor at the University of Waterloo in Ontario, Canada.

Strickland served as fellow, vice president, and president of Optica (formerly OSA), and is currently chair of its Presidential Advisory Committee. In 2018, she was listed as one of BBC's 100 Women. She has gone on to have the Natural Sciences and Engineering Research Council of Canada Prize being set in her name.

== Early life and education ==
Strickland was born on May 27, 1959, in Guelph, Ontario, Canada to Edith J. (née Ranney), an English teacher, and Lloyd Strickland, an electrical engineer. After graduating from Guelph Collegiate Vocational Institute, she decided to attend McMaster University because its engineering physics program included lasers and electro-optics, areas of particular interest to her. At McMaster, she was one of three women in a class of twenty-five. Strickland graduated with a Bachelor of Engineering degree in engineering physics in 1981.

Strickland studied for her graduate degree in The Institute of Optics at the University of Rochester, receiving a Doctor of Philosophy degree in 1989. She conducted her doctoral research at the associated Laboratory for Laser Energetics, supervised by Gérard Mourou. Strickland and Mourou worked to develop an experimental setup that could raise the peak power of laser pulses, to overcome a limitation: that when the maximal intensity of laser pulses reached gigawatts per square centimetre, self-focusing of the pulses severely damaged the amplifying part of the laser. Their 1985 technique of chirped pulse amplification stretched out each laser pulse both spectrally and in time before amplifying it, then compressed each pulse back to its original duration, generating ultrashort optical pulses of terawatt to petawatt intensity. Using chirped pulse amplification allowed smaller high-power laser systems to be built on a typical laboratory optical table, as "table-top terawatt lasers". The work received the 2018 Nobel Prize in Physics.

== Career and research ==
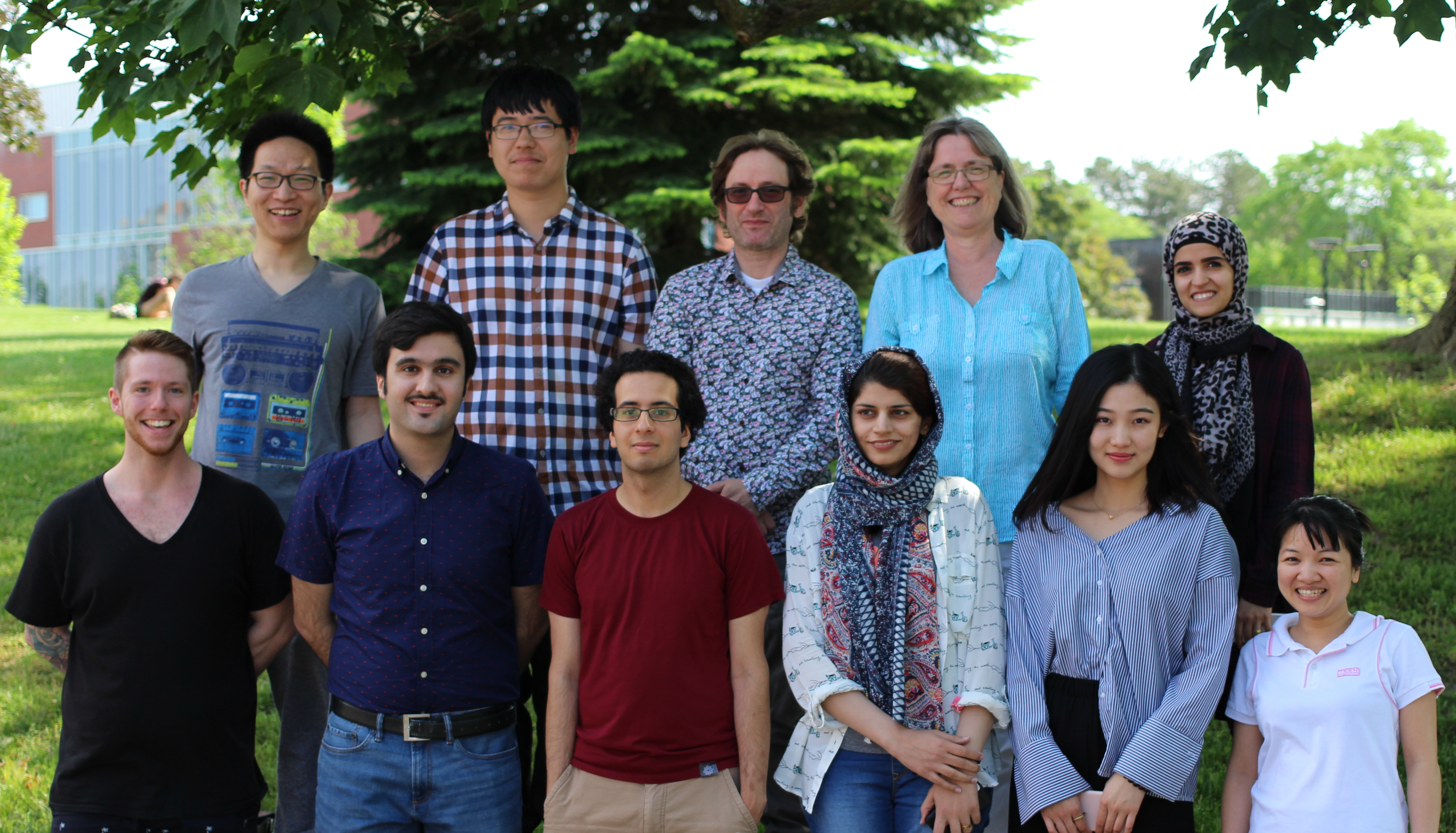
Strickland's ultrafast laser group at the University of Waterloo in 2017

From 1988 to 1991, Strickland was a research associate at the National Research Council of Canada, where she worked with Paul Corkum in the Ultrafast Phenomena Section, which had the distinction at that time of having produced the most powerful short-pulse laser in the world. She worked in the laser division of Lawrence Livermore National Laboratory from 1991 to 1992 and joined the technical staff of Princeton University's Advanced Technology Center for Photonics and Opto-electronic Materials in 1992. She joined the University of Waterloo in 1997 as an assistant professor. She became the first full-time female professor in physics at the University of Waterloo. Strickland is currently a professor, leading an ultrafast laser group that develops high-intensity laser systems for nonlinear optics investigations. She has described herself as a "laser jock":

I think it's because we thought we were good with our hands. As an experimentalist, you need to understand the physics, but you also need to be able to actually make something work, and the lasers were very finicky in those days.

Strickland's recent work has focused on pushing the boundaries of ultrafast optical science to new wavelength ranges such as the mid-infrared and the ultraviolet, using techniques such as two-colour or multi-frequency methods, as well as Raman generation. She is also working on the role of high-power lasers in the microcrystalline lens of the human eye, during the process of micromachining of the eye lens to cure presbyopia.

Strickland, 2016

Strickland became a fellow of Optica (Note: Then known as Optical Society of America (OSA).) in 2008. She served as its vice president and president in 2011 and 2013 respectively, and was a topical editor of its journal Optics Letters from 2004 to 2010. She is currently the chair of Optica's Presidential Advisory Committee. She is a member of and previously served as a board member and Director of Academic Affairs for the Canadian Association of Physicists. She is an inaugural and active co-director of the University of Waterloo's Trust in Research Undertaken in Science and Technology (TRuST) Scholarly Network, established in 2023.

== Nobel Prize ==
On 2 October 2018, Strickland was awarded the Nobel Prize in Physics for her work on chirped pulse amplification with her doctoral adviser Gérard Mourou. Arthur Ashkin received the other half of the prize for unrelated work on optical tweezers. She became the third woman ever to be awarded the Nobel Prize in Physics, after Marie Curie in 1903 and Maria Goeppert Mayer in 1963.

Strickland and Mourou published their pioneering work "Compression of amplified chirped optical pulses" in 1985, while Strickland was still a doctoral student under Mourou. (Note: Strickland attempted to add Steve Williamson as an author of the article, but Williamson removed the name as "he hadn't done enough".) Their invention of chirped pulse amplification for lasers at the Laboratory for Laser Energetics in Rochester led to the development of the field of high-intensity ultrashort pulses of light beams. Because the ultrabrief and ultrasharp light beams are capable of making extremely precise cuts, the technique is used in laser micromachining, laser surgery, medicine, fundamental science studies, and other applications. It has enabled doctors to perform millions of corrective laser eye surgeries. She said that after developing the technique, they knew it would be a significant discovery.

When she received the Nobel Prize, many commentators were surprised that she had not reached the rank of full professor. In response, Strickland said that she had "never applied" for a professorship; "it doesn't carry necessarily a pay raise ... I never filled out the paper work ... I do what I want to do and that wasn't worth doing." Strickland had not applied to be a full professor prior to her Nobel prize, but in October 2018, she told the BBC that she had subsequently applied and was promoted to full professorship at the University of Waterloo.

== Awards and recognition ==
Awards and prizes

- Nobel Prize in Physics, awarded jointly with Gérard Mourou for the development of chirped pulse amplification (2018)
- Alfred P. Sloan Research Fellowship (1998)
- Premier's Research Excellence Award (1999)
- Cottrell Scholars Award, Research Corporation (2000)
- Golden Plate Award, American Academy of Achievement, presented by Frances Arnold (2019)
- Joseph Carrier C.S.C. Science Medal, University of Notre Dame (2022)

Orders and national honours

- Companion of the Order of Canada (2019)
- Chevalier de la Légion d'honneur (2022)

Fellowships and academy memberships

- Fellow of Optica (formerly the Optical Society of America) (2008)
- Fellow of the Royal Society of Canada (FRSC) (2019)
- Honorary Fellow of the Canadian Academy of Engineering (2019)
- Member of the National Academy of Sciences (2020)
- Fellow of the Royal Society (FRS) (2020)
- Member of the Pontifical Academy of Sciences (2021)
- Honorary Member of Optica (2022)
- Corresponding Member of the Australian Academy of Science (2025)
- Honorary Fellow of the Institute of Physics (HonFInstP)

Honorary degrees

- Honorary Doctor of Science, University of Alberta (2024)

== Personal life ==
Strickland is married to Douglas Dykaar, who received a doctorate in electrical engineering from the University of Rochester. They have two children: Hannah, a graduate student in astrophysics at the University of Toronto, and Adam, who is studying comedy at Humber College. Strickland is an active member of the United Church of Canada.

== Selected publications ==
- Strickland, Donna; Mourou, Gerard (1985). "Compression of amplified chirped optical pulses". Optics Communications. 56 (3): 219–221. Bibcode:1985OptCo..56..219S. doi:10.1016/0030-4018(85)90120-8. ISSN 0030-4018.
- Maine, P.; Strickland, D.; Bado, P.; Pessot, M.; Mourou, G. (1988). "Generation of ultrahigh peak power pulses by chirped pulse amplification". IEEE Journal of Quantum Electronics. 24 (2): 398–403. Bibcode:1988IJQE...24..398M. doi:10.1109/3.137. ISSN 0018-9197.
- Strickland, D.; Corkum, P. B. (1994). "Resistance of short pulses to self-focusing". Journal of the Optical Society of America B. 11 (3): 492–497. Bibcode:1994JOSAB..11..492S. doi:10.1364/JOSAB.11.000492. S2CID 122336320.

== See also ==
- Criticism of Wikipedia § Notability of article topics
- List of University of Waterloo people
- Women in physics

== Notes ==
Professional and academic associations
Preceded by Tony Heinz	President of The Optical Society; 2013	Succeeded by Philip H. Bucksbaum
Awards
Preceded by Rainer Weiss	Nobel Prize in Physics; 2018	Succeeded by Jim Peebles
Preceded by Barry Barish	Nobel Prize in Physics; 2018	Succeeded by Michel Mayor
Preceded by Kip Thorne	Nobel Prize in Physics; 2018	Succeeded by Didier Queloz
