= Gérard Mourou =

French physicist and Nobel laureate (born 1944)

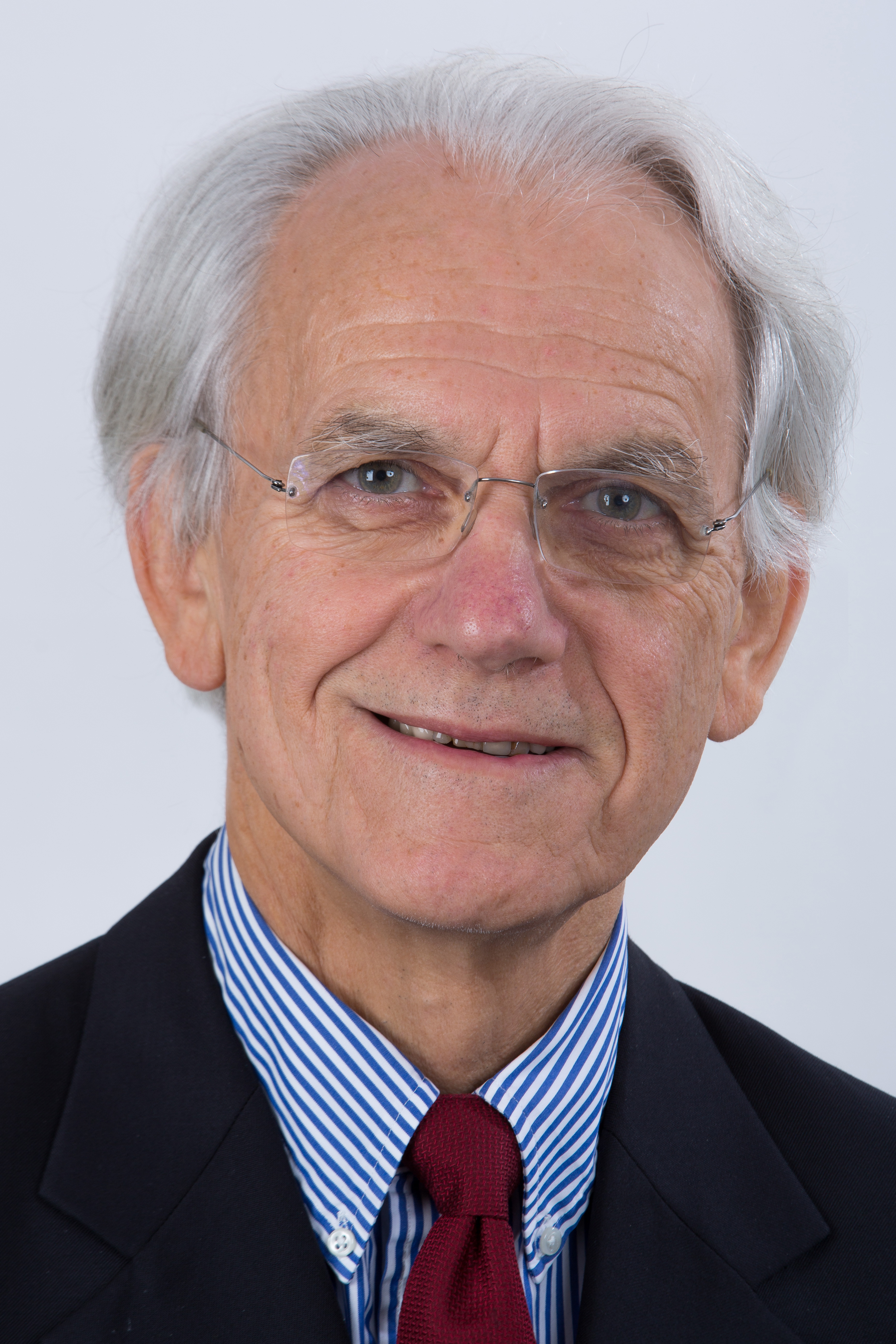
- Mourou in 2014
- Born: Gérard Albert Mourou; 22 June 1944 (age 82); Albertville, Occupied France
- Education: University of Grenoble (BSc, MSc); Pierre and Marie Curie University (PhD)
- Known for: Chirped pulse amplification
- Awards: R. W. Wood Prize (1995); Nobel Prize in Physics (2018)
- Scientific career
- Workplaces: École polytechnique ENSTA ParisTech; University of Rochester; University of Michigan; N. I. Lobachevsky State University of Nizhny Novgorod; Peking University
- Doctoral students: Donna Strickland

Gérard Albert Mourou (French: [ʒeʁaʁ muʁu]; born 22 June 1944) is a French scientist and pioneer in the field of electrical engineering and lasers. He was awarded a Nobel Prize in Physics in 2018, along with Donna Strickland, for the invention of chirped pulse amplification, a technique later used to create ultrashort-pulse, very high-intensity (petawatt) laser pulses.

In 1994, Mourou and his team at the University of Michigan discovered that the balance between the self-focusing refraction (see Kerr effect) and self-attenuating diffraction by ionization and rarefaction of a laser beam of terawatt intensities in the atmosphere creates "filaments" that act as waveguides for the beam, thus preventing divergence.

== Career ==
Mourou was born on 22 June 1944 in Albertville, France. Mourou obtained a PhD degree from Pierre and Marie Curie University in 1973. He then moved to the United States, spending a year as a postdoctoral student at the University of California San Diego. He later became a professor at the University of Rochester in 1977, where he and his then student Donna Strickland produced their Nobel prize-winning work in the Laboratory for Laser Energetics at the university in the 1980s. The pair co-invented chirped pulse amplification, a "method of generating high-intensity, ultra-short optical pulses". Strickland's doctoral thesis was on "development of an ultra-bright laser and an application to multi-photon ionization".

Mourou joined the University of Michigan in 1988, where he became the founding director of the Center for Ultrafast Optical Science in 1990 or 1991. He subsequently returned to France as a professor at the École polytechnique to direct the Laboratoire d'optique appliquée at ENSTA from 2005 to 2009 and develop the Extreme Light Infrastructure project from 2007 on.

In October 2024, he was appointed as a Chair Professor at Peking University. He is also the A. D. Moore Distinguished University Professor Emeritus at the University of Michigan.

=== Nobel Prize ===
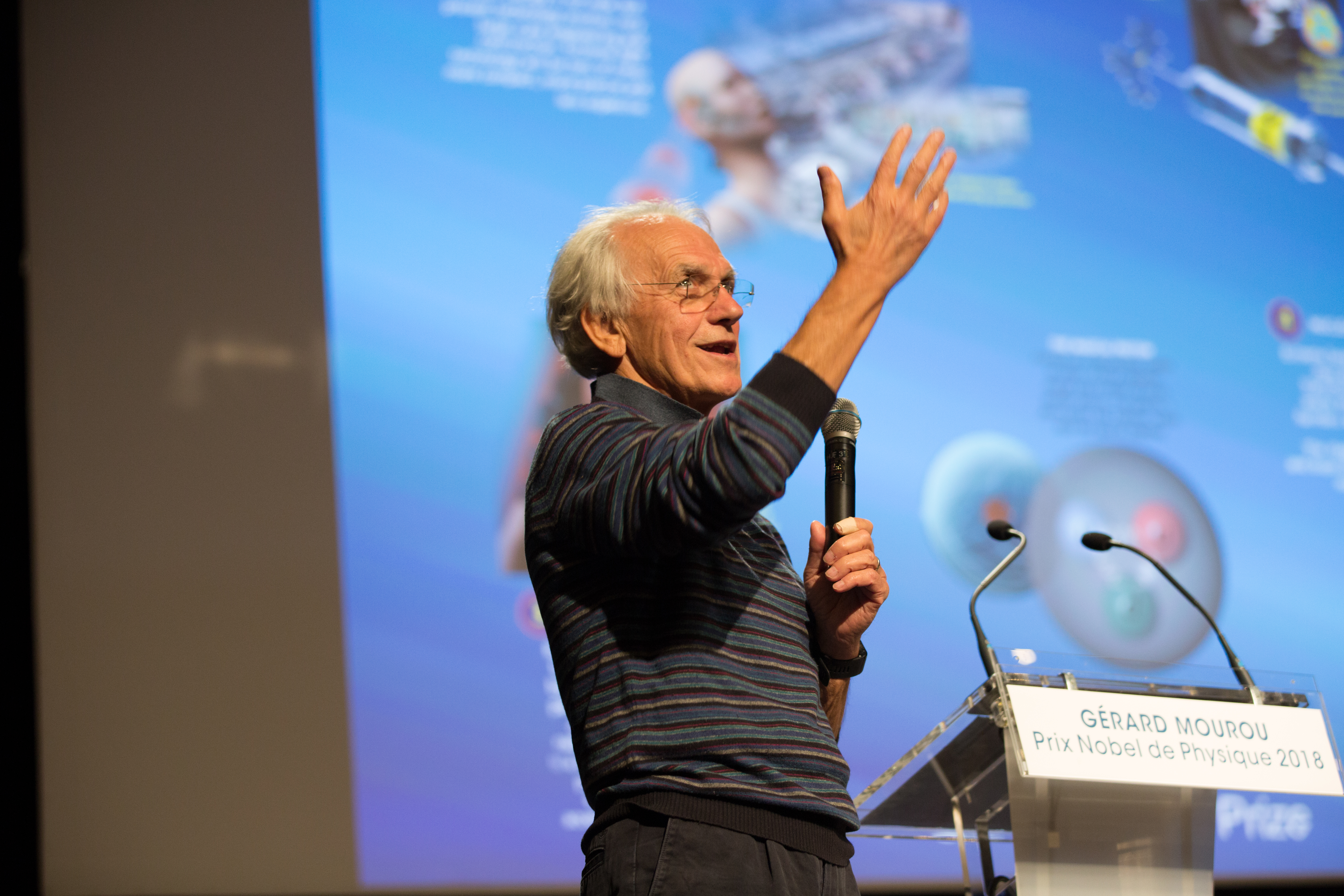
Mourou, speaking in 2018 after being awarded the Nobel Prize

On 2 October 2018, Mourou and Strickland were awarded the Nobel Prize in Physics, for their joint work on chirped pulse amplification. They shared half of the Prize, while the other half was awarded to Arthur Ashkin for his invention of "optical tweezers that grab particles, atoms, viruses and other living cells with their laser beam fingers".

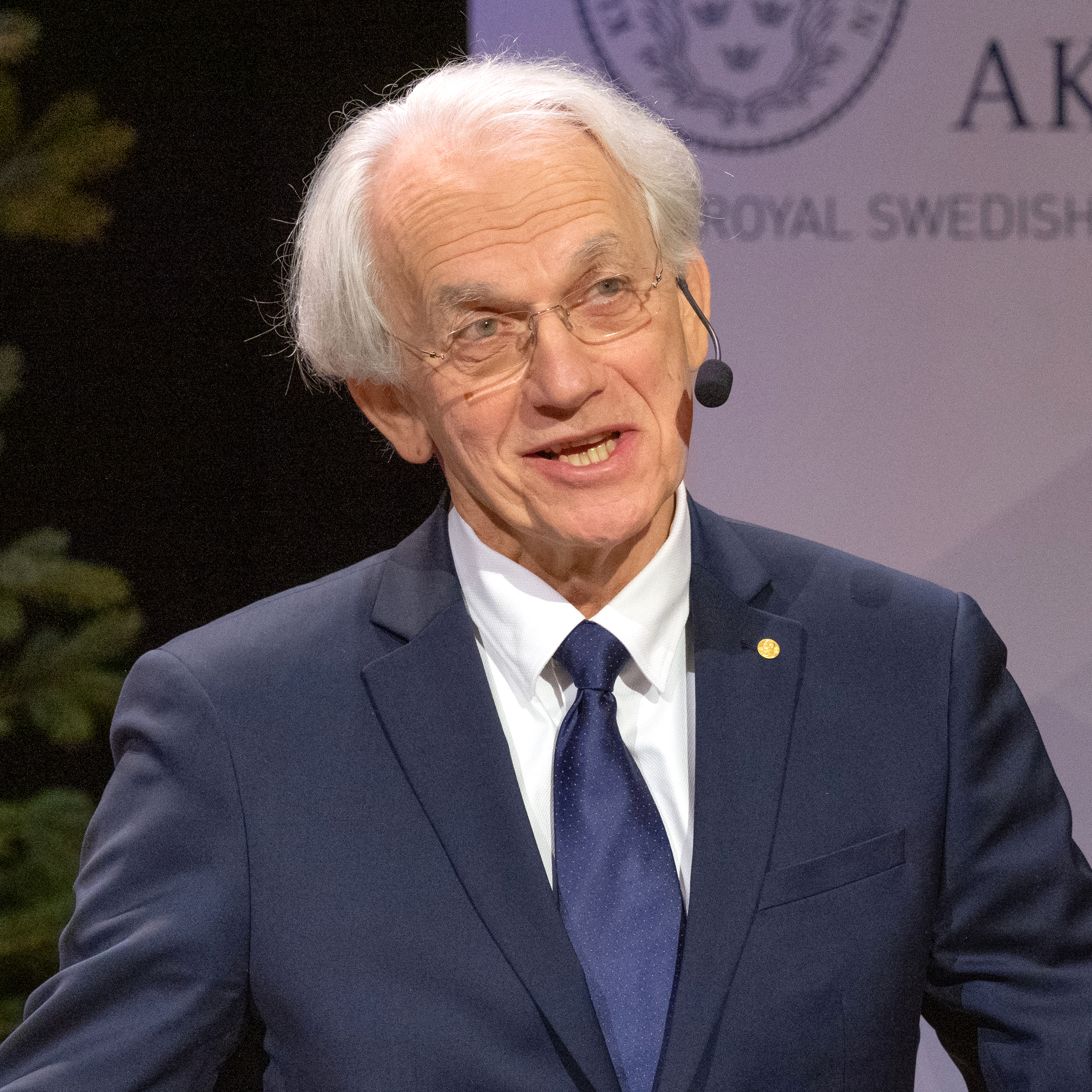
Gérard Mourou during Nobel press conference in Stockholm, December 2018

Mourou and Strickland found that stretching a laser out reduced its peak power, which could then be greatly amplified using normal instruments. It could then be compressed to create the short-lived, highly powerful lasers they were after. The technique, which was described in Strickland's first scientific publication, came to be known as chirped pulse amplification (CPA). They were probably unaware at the time that their tools would make it possible to study natural phenomena in unprecedented ways. CPA could also per definition be used to create a laser pulse that only lasts one attosecond, one-billionth of a billionth of a second. At those timescales, it became possible not only to study chemical reactions, but what happens inside individual atoms.

The Guardian and Scientific American provided simplified summaries of the work of Strickland and Mourou: it "paved the way for the shortest, most intense laser beams ever created". "The ultrabrief, ultrasharp beams can be used to make extremely precise cuts so their technique is now used in laser machining and enables doctors to perform millions of corrective" laser eye surgeries. Canadian Prime Minister Justin Trudeau acknowledged the achievements of Mourou and Strickland: "Their innovative work can be found in applications including corrective eye surgery, and is expected to have a significant impact on cancer therapy and other physics research in the future".

== Controversy ==
At the time he received the Nobel prize, a publicity video filmed in 2010 to represent the Extreme Light Infrastructure (ELI), went viral. It featured female students swaying around Mourou and losing their lab coats. It was widely criticized, included by the Nobel committee for its representation of women in sciences. Mourou commented it was intended as humoristic, and added: "I am not very proud of this video".

== Awards and honors ==
- 1995 – R. W. Wood Prize by the OSA
- 1997 – SPIE Harold E. Edgerton Award
- 2002 – National Academy of Engineering Member
- 2004 – IEEE LEOS Quantum Electronics Award
- 2005 – Willis E. Lamb Award for Laser Science and Quantum Optics
- 2009 – Charles Hard Townes Award by the OSA
- 2016 – Frederic Ives Medal
- 2016 – Berthold Leibinger Zukunftspreis
- 2018 – Arthur L. Schawlow Prize in Laser Science by the American Physical Society
- 2018 – Nobel Prize in Physics, together with Arthur Ashkin and Donna Strickland
- 2020 – Honorary Doctorate of Vilnius University
- 25 February 2020 – Honorary Doctorate of Bulgarian Academy of Sciences, ceremony

== Writings ==
- Mourou, Gérard (2004). "53. The dawn of ultrafast science and technology at the University of Rochester." (PDF). In Stroud, Carlos (ed.). A Jewel in the Crown: 75th Anniversary Essays of The Institute of Optics of the University of Rochester. Rochester, NY: Meliora Press. p. 272. ISBN 978-1-58046-162-7. Archived from the original (PDF) on 3 October 2018.
