= Extreme Light Infrastructure =

European physics research organization

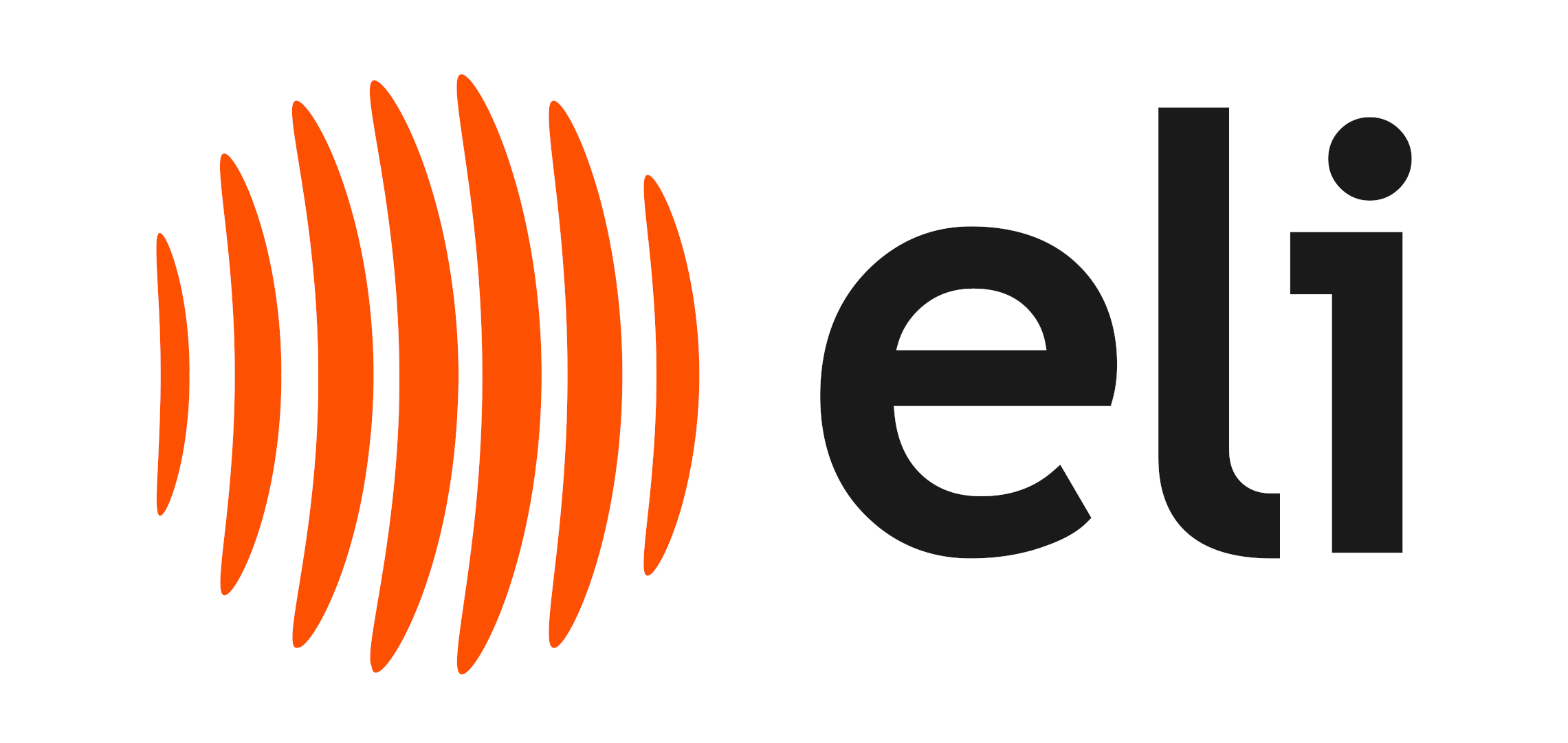
- Abbreviation: ELI ERIC
- Formation: April 30, 2021; 5 years ago
- Headquarters: Dolní Břežany, Czech Republic (ELI Beamlines); Szeged, Hungary (ELI ALPS); Măgurele, Romania (ELI NP)
- Services: Research Institute
- Subsidiaries: ELI Beamlines, ELI ALPS, and ELI NP.
- Website: eli-laser.eu

The Extreme Light Infrastructure (ELI) is a research organization with the world's largest collection of high power-lasers. ELI operates several high-power, high-repetition-rate laser systems which enable the research of physical, chemical, materials, and medical sciences.

ELI is part of the European Research Infrastructure Consortium (ERIC), where the official name and abbreviation came from: ELI ERIC. The organization consists of three complementary facilities, as well as collaborations with universities and research labs across the world. One of the facilities is ELI Beamlines, located outside of Prague in Dolní Břežany, Czech Republic; another facility, ELI ALPS (Attosecond Laser Pulse Source), is located in Szeged, Hungary; and the third facility is located in Măgurele, Romania (ELI Nuclear Physics, abbreviated as ELI NP).

== History ==
From 2007 to 2010 ELI entered into a European-Commission-funded preparatory phase, comprising 40 laboratories from 13 countries. Gérard Mourou, the initiator of the ELI project, was the coordinator of the preparatory phase.

At the meeting of the Steering Committee in October 2009 in Prague, the ELI Preparatory Phase Consortium officially gave the mandate to the Czech Republic, Hungary and Romania to proceed towards the construction of ELI. On December 10, 2010, at the end of the preparatory phase, the project was fully handed over to the ELI Delivery Consortium, consisting of representatives from the three host countries. ERDF funding of the ELI-Beamlines facility in the Czech Republic was granted by the European Commission on April 20, 2011, followed by ELI-Nuclear Physics in Romania on September 18, 2012. Funding for the ELI-ALPS facility in Hungary was granted in early 2014.

The ELI Delivery Consortium International Association (ELI-DC) non-profit association was founded on April 11, 2013. On April 30, 2021, the European Commission granted ELI the legal status of an ERIC.

== ELI research facilities ==
=== ELI Beamlines ===
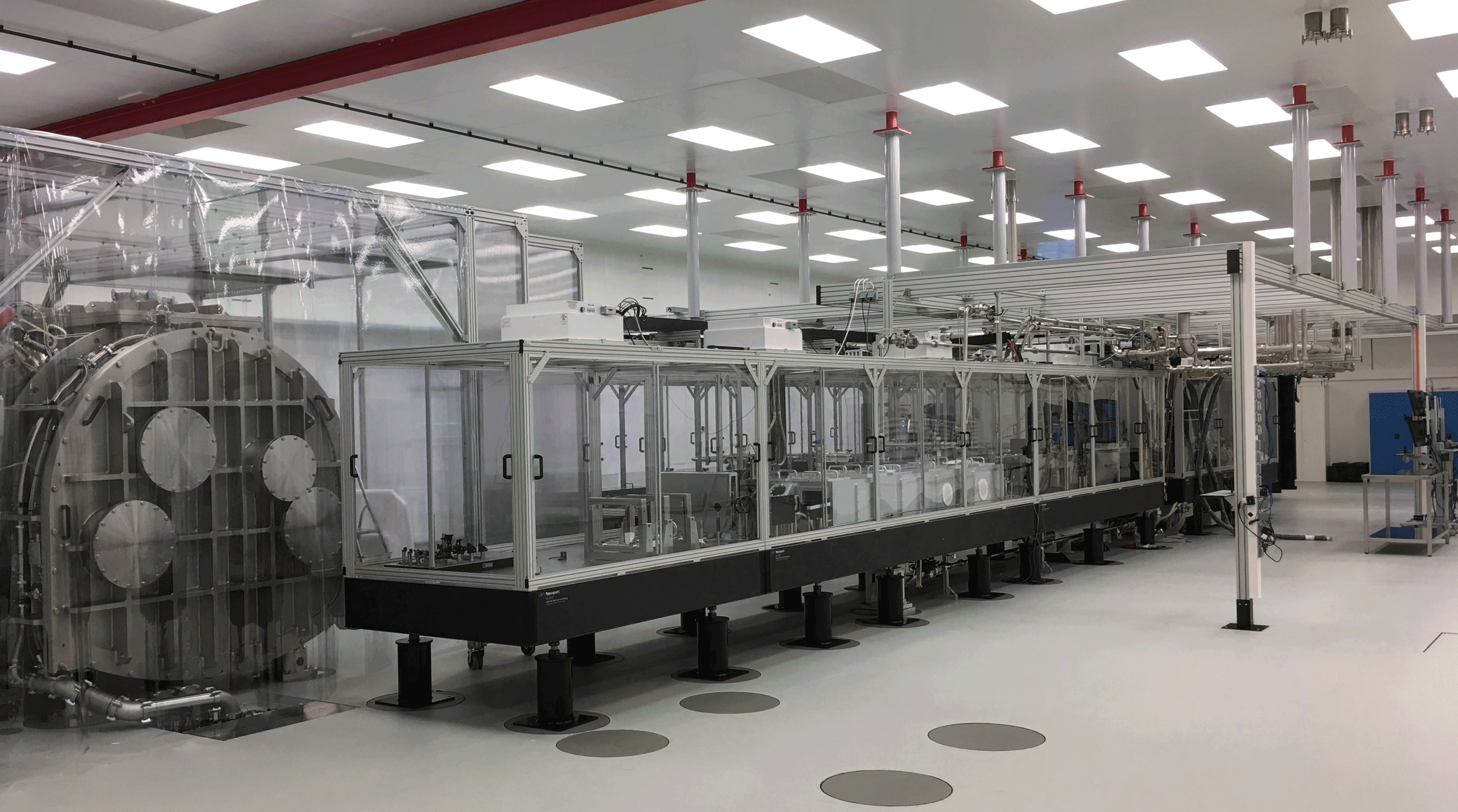
View of the L3 HAPLS

ELI Beamlines is located in Dolní Břežany near Prague, Czech Republic. ELI Beamlines operates high peak-power femtosecond laser systems with high-energy and high-repetition-rate capability, as well as secondary sources (X-rays and accelerated particles). The facility opened in 2015. User experiments started in 2018. There are four primary sources at ELI Beamlines, seven secondary sources and five scientific endstations and experimental platforms.

==== ELI Beamlines Primary Sources ====
L1 ALLEGRA – TW laser, 100 millijoule, 1 kHz – status: in operation – The L1 ALLEGRA laser was developed in house by the ELI Beamlines laser team. The concept of the laser is based entirely on amplification of frequency chirped picosecond pulses in an optical parametric chirped pulse amplification (OPCPA) chain consisting of a total of seven amplifiers. The OPCPA amplifier stages are pumped by precisely synchronized picosecond pulses generated by state-of-the-art thin-disk-based Yb:YAG laser systems.

L2 DUHA – 100TW laser, 2 joule, 50 Hz – status: in operation – The L2 DUHA laser is designed to provide 100 TW-level pulses at a high repetition rate (50 Hz) at 820 nm, falling between L1-ALLEGRA and L3-HAPLS in terms of peak power. L2-DUHA is the newest of the ELI Beamlines laser systems and is currently in development with expected completion in the first half of 2024.

L3 HAPLS – 1PW laser, 30 joule, 10 Hz – status: in operation – This laser system was developed at the Lawrence Livermore National Laboratory, with ELI Beamlines cooperating on the development of the PW pulse compressor, the short-pulse diagnostics, and the short-pulse part controls and timing. These are the highest peak-power pulsed laser diode arrays in the world.

L4 ATON – 10PW laser, 2 kilojoule – status: in operation – This laser system is designed to generate an extremely high peak power of 10 PW (Petawatt) in pulses with duration of 150 fs, pulse energy 1.5 kJ and repetition rate 1 shot per minute. The laser was built by the consortium of National Energetics (USA) and EKSPLA (Lithuania), with major contribution of ELI Beamlines, which developed the 10 PW compressor and participated in development of numerous subsystems including the OPCPA preamplifiers, diagnostics or integrated electronic control system.

=== ELI-ALPS ===
ELI-ALPS is located in Szeged, in southern Hungary. The ELI-ALPS research facility houses lasers which are used for the generation of ultra-intense, ultrashort pulses of laser light and various electromagnetic particles. These ultrafast, high-repetition-rate bursts span a broad electromagnetic spectrum, ranging from terahertz frequencies (10^{12} Hz) to X-ray wavelengths (10^{18} to 10^{19} Hz). The facility contains a variety of powerful laser systems, allowing for in-depth studies of the dynamics involved in interactions between light and matter. These studies encompass both non-relativistic and relativistic speeds, allowing for the study of phenomena occurring on timescales as brief as a few femtoseconds. The facility opened in 2017. User experiments started in 2018.

ELI-ALPS laser systems
Laser Source	Central Wavelength	Pulse Energy	Pulse Duration	Repetition Rate	Peak Power	Average Power
HR 1	1030 nm	1 mJ	7 fs	100 kHz	200 GW	100 W
HR 2	1030 nm	5 mJ	6.7 fs	100 kHz	1 TW	500 W
SYLOS 2	900 nm	35 mJ	7 fs	1 kHz	5 TW	35 W
SYLOS ALIGNMENT	850 nm	40 mJ	12 fs	10 Hz	3 TW	0.4 W
HF PW	800 nm	34 J	17 fs	10 Hz	2 PW	340 W
MIR	2.8–4 μm	150 μJ	40 fs	100 kHz	3 GW	15 W
THz pump	1 μm	500 mJ	500 fs	50 Hz	1 TW	25 W

=== ELI-NP ===
NASA Administrator Bill Nelson visiting the ELI-NP facility in 2024

ELI-NP (Nuclear Physics) is located in Măgurele, Romania. It will host two machines, a very high intensity laser, where beams from two 10 PW lasers are coherently added to get intensities of the order of 10^{23} – 10^{24} W/cm^{2}, and a very intense, brilliant gamma beam obtained by incoherent Compton back scattering of a laser light off a brilliant electron beam from a conventional linear accelerator. Applications include frontier fundamental physics, new nuclear physics, astrophysics, nuclear materials and radioactive waste management. ELI NP is the largest investment ever made in scientific research in Romania, co-financed by the European Commission and the Romanian Government from Structural Funds via the European Regional Development Fund (ERDF).

In a decision made during ELI ERIC's 8th General Assembly (GA) Meeting on 13 June 2023, Romania was accepted as a Founding Observer to ELI ERIC. The facility will be integrated into the ELI ERIC organization over the next three years.

==== ELI-NP systems ====
The key components of ELI-NP are the High Power Laser System (HPLS) and the Laser Beam Transport System (LBTS). Developed and installed by the Thales Group, the laser system has been operational since 2020. The two beam system provides two optically synchronous outputs for each of its three power levels: 10 PW, 1 PW, and 100 TW. The pulses are then delivered to five different experimental areas.

HPLS (twin beam)
Peak Power	Central Wavelength	Pulse Energy	Pulse Duration	Repetition Rate
10 PW	800 nm	243 J	<23 fs	1/60 Hz
1 PW	800 nm	25 J	<24 fs	1 Hz
100 TW	800 nm	2.7 J	<25 fs	10 Hz

The Gamma-ray Beam System (ELI-GBS) is the dedicated system for delivering gamma-ray beams. The system can deliver gamma-rays with energy continuously variable from 1 MeV up to 19.5 MeV. The quasi-monochromatic electron beam system operates in the range of 234 MeV to 742 MeV. The first electron beam of ELI-GBS was successfully generated in 2026.

== ELI-NP Controversy ==
Romania's journey to join the ELI ERIC consortium has been controversial due to a protracted legal disagreement over the construction of a gamma beam at the ELI-NP facility. Romania's national institute of physics, IFIN-HH, and the EuroGammaS consortium became embroiled in this dispute, which spiraled into a larger legal dispute involving contractual disagreements. The contention reached a climax when the Franco-Italian consortium EuroGammaS halted work on the gamma beam, alleging non-compliance of the building with equipment specifications. In response, IFIN-HH sought delay penalties and even hinted at canceling the €67 million contract. As counteraction, EuroGammaS initiated a legal battle in Bucharest, demanding contract extensions and fine reimbursements.

Such disagreements led to Romania's omission from the ELI-ERIC consortium when it was officially launched in 2021. In May 2021, a significant turn of events occurred when the Czech Republic, Hungary, Italy, and Lithuania, with the UK as a founding observer, applied to the European Commission to form the ELI-ERIC, excluding Romania. This exclusion was met with resistance from the management of ELI-NP, which criticized the decision as an attempt to "isolate" the Bucharest facility and called for the application's rejection. The ongoing litigation and political nuances created a divide. Romania felt blindsided by the decision to proceed without them, whereas the consortium claimed Romanian stakeholders were informed. Additionally, there were differing visions about the operational autonomy of each laser site within the ERIC. While the Czech Republic and Hungary advocated for an integrated international facility, Romania sought greater autonomy, aiming to leverage its funding surplus to aid local research projects.

Romania has since secured a "founding observer" status in the consortium, which may eventually lead to full membership in the organization. Following the EuroGammaS contract's termination, the responsibility was passed to a US company, Lyncean Technologies, with a €42 million deal. The controversy continued as Lyncean declared bankruptcy, leaving the gamma beam project in limbo. Financial pressures also loom large, with the €300 million project heavily reliant on EU structural funds, necessitating its completion by 2023 to preserve funding.

== See also ==
- Station of Extreme Light

== Bibliography ==
- The Extreme Light Infrastructure ERIC Annual Report 2022-2023 (PDF) (Report). ELI ERIC. 2022.
- Lureau, François; Matras, Guillaume; Chalus, Olivier; Derycke, Christophe; Morbieu, Thomas; Ursescu, Daniel (2020). "High-energy hybrid femtosecond laser system demonstrating 2 × 10 PW capability". High Power Laser Science and Engineering. 8 (4).
