= Station of Extreme Light =

High power laser

Coordinates: 31.378428°N 121.23689°E

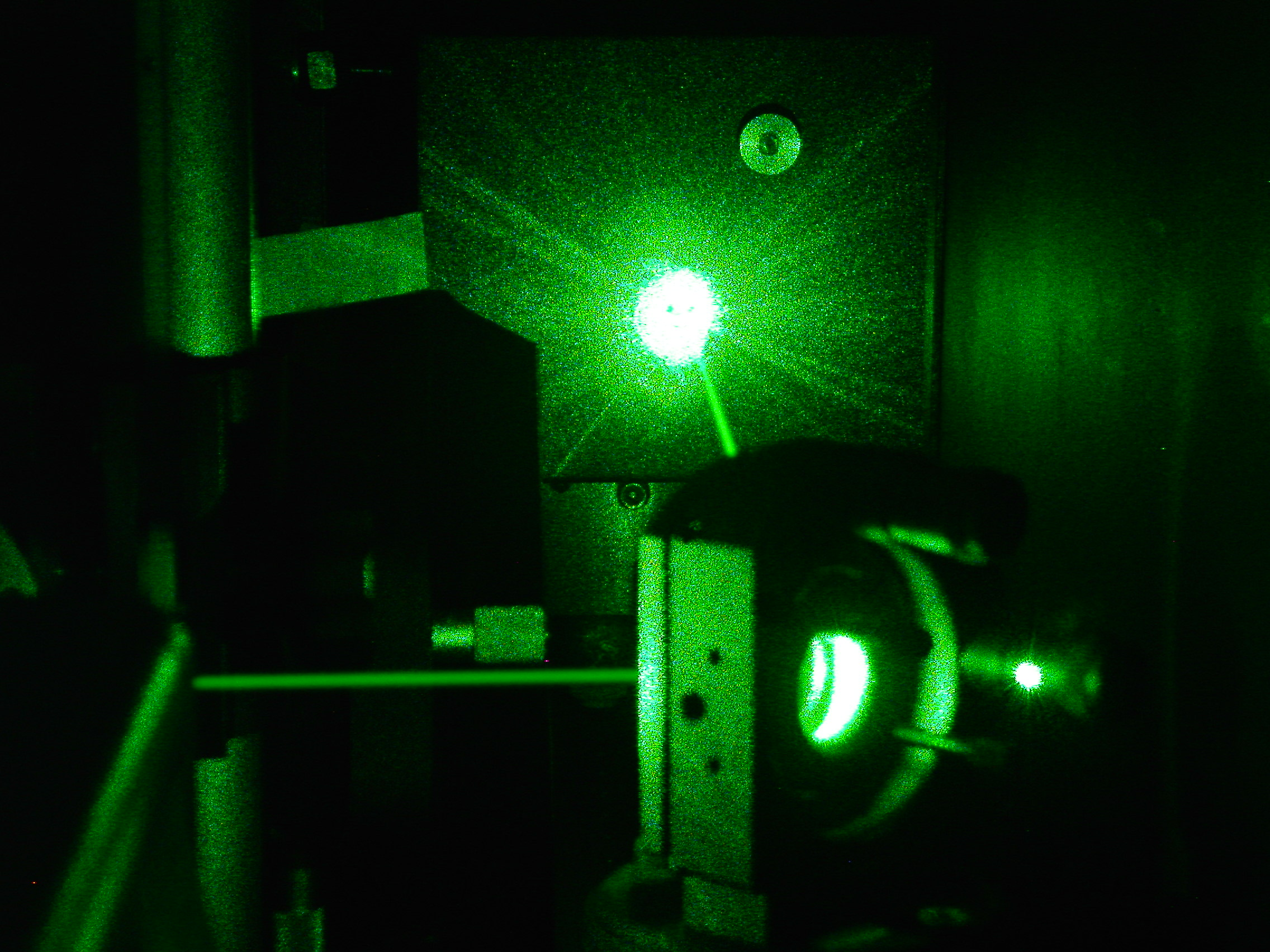
Example of petawatt laser

The Station of Extreme Light (SEL, 极端光物理线站) is laser facility aimed at producing a laser with 100 petawatts (PW) of peak power. The station is currently under construction in Shanghai, China. The laser may be powerful enough to produce matter and antimatter directly from a vacuum (the Schwinger effect).

Upon completion, the laser was at one time said to have been expected to be the most powerful on Earth, with an instantaneous power that according to the prediction at that time was to be 10,000 times the power of all the world's electrical grids combined, and a trillion trillion times more intense than sunlight, albeit only for a tiny fraction of a second. The facility was formerly scheduled for completion in 2023 and was at that time expected to be able to provide focused intensity of more than 10^{23} W/cm^{2}. As of 2022, the predicted completion date had slipped to 2025.

== See also ==
- Extreme Light Infrastructure
