= BELLA (laser) =

Laser developed by the Thales Group

The Berkeley Lab Laser Accelerator (BELLA) is a laser built by the Thales Group and owned and operated by the Lawrence Berkeley National Laboratory. On 20 July 2012, BELLA fired a 40 femtosecond laser pulse, establishing a world record for most powerful laser.

BELLA was designed and built by Thales as part of the Laser and Optical Accelerator Systems Integrated Studies (LOASIS) program at LBNL. The LOASIS group studies the application of high-powered lasers to build compact particle accelerators. The BELLA laser was developed for the purposes of studying this principle. The idea is that a laser which delivers a large amount of power in a very short pulse can cause ionization in a gas followed by plasma oscillation. As a result the gas will emit electron bundles which can be used for medical imaging or materials research.

On 20 July 2012, BELLA fired a laser pulse with a duration of 40 femtoseconds and a repetition frequency of 1 hertz. The pulses had a compressed output energy of 42.2 joule, making the power output of the laser 1 petawatt:

${42.2 J \over 40 fs} = {42.2 J \over 40*10^{-15} s} \approx 1*10^{15} J/s = 1 PW$

This result established BELLA as the highest peak power laser in the world (at a 1 Hz repetition rate).

In December, 2014, a team of researchers accelerated electrons using BELLA up to an energy of 4.25 GeV—the absolute highest energies recorded to date using a compact accelerator.
