= Vulcan laser =

Infrared laser

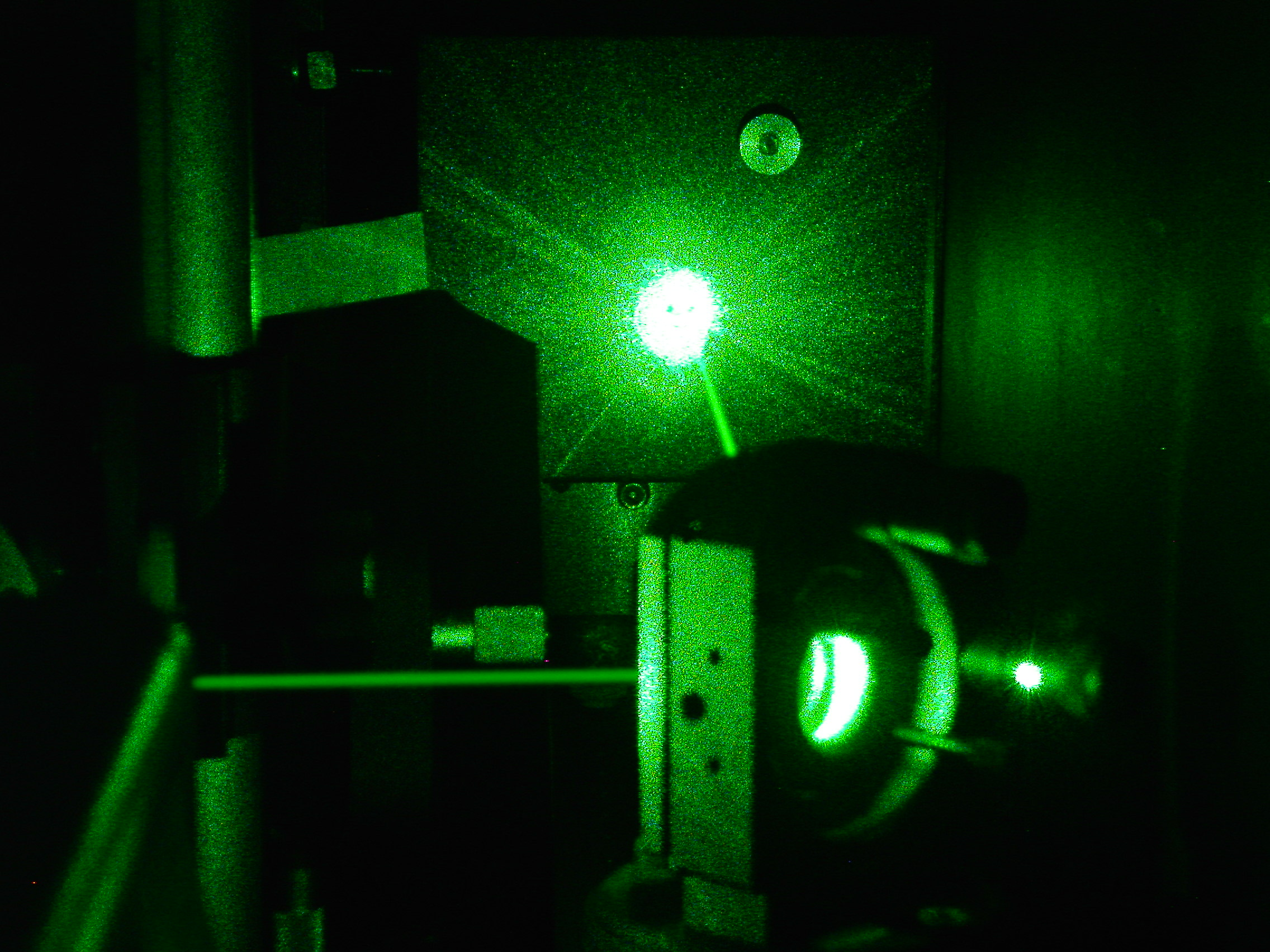
The Vulcan Laser, part of the Central Laser Facility onsite at the Rutherford Appleton Laboratory, Oxfordshire

The Vulcan laser is an infrared, 8-beam, petawatt neodymium glass laser at the Rutherford Appleton Laboratory's Central Laser Facility in Oxfordshire, United Kingdom. It was the facility's first operational laser.

It is designed to deliver irradiance on target of 10^{21} W/cm^{2} for a wide-ranging experimental programme in fundamental physics and advanced applications. This includes the interaction of super high intensity light with matter, fast ignition fusion research, photon induced nuclear reactions, electron and ion acceleration by light waves, astrophysics in the laboratory and the exploration of the world of plasma dominated by relativity.

In 2005 the Vulcan laser was the highest-intensity focussed laser in the world, certified by the Guinness Book of World Records, capable of producing a petawatt laser beam with a focused intensity of 10^{21} W/cm^{2}.

== Target Areas ==
There are currently two active target areas, Target Area Petawatt and Target Area West, Following the decommission of Target Area East.

=== Target Area West ===
Target Area West operates with dual short pulse beamlines delivering intensities of 10^{19} W/cm^{2} for pump-probe experiments using F3 focussing optics, other configurations are available. Six long pulse beams can be configured alongside the short pulses in multiple configurations, including single side cluster, cylindrical and spherical compression. The long pulse beams can be operated with pulse lengths from 0.5ns up to 8ns and energy from 50J to 300J per beam. Various pulse configurations can be set, including pre and post pulses.

=== Target Area Petawatt ===
Target Area Petawatt provides a single short pulse on target with a long pulse beamline, It is configured to deliver the highest intensity via a large parabolic mirror. As with Target Area West, various pulse configurations are possible.

== Performance ==
Vulcan can deliver 500J on target in a compressed pulse of 500fs giving a peak irradiance of 10^{21} W/cm^{2} in a 5μm focal spot. This performance is not possible solely by Nd:glass amplifiers, since gain narrowing would reduce the pulse bandwidth below a limit required to support the pulse duration.

- A novel front end amplification system based on Optical Parametric Chirped Pulse Amplification (OPCPA), involving the pulse being stretched temporally pre-amplification, followed by a pulse compressor. This generates pulses of around 10mJ at a large bandwidth (1 mJ nm^{−1}) for injection into the Vulcan rod and disc amplifier chain.
- The amplifier chain is optimised for bandwidth using a combination of Nd:phosphate and Nd:silicate amplifying media.
- An Adaptive optics (AO) system implemented to improve the beam quality to near diffraction limited.

== See also ==
- Central Laser Facility
- Rutherford Appleton Laboratory
- List of laser types
- Chirped pulse amplification
- National Ignition Facility
