= Central Laser Facility =

Coordinates: 51.5726°N 1.3159°W

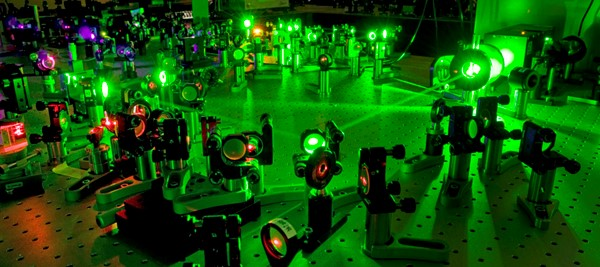
Vulcan project, Central Laser Facility, 18 June 2009

Central Laser Facility (CLF) is a research facility in the UK. It is part of the Rutherford Appleton Laboratory. The facility is dedicated to studying the applications of high energy lasers. It was opened in 1976. As of 2013 there are 5 active laser laboratories at the CLF: Vulcan, Astra Gemini, Artemis, ULTRA, and OCTOPUS. The facility provides both high-power and high-sensitivity lasers for study across broad fields of science from atomic and plasma physics to medical diagnostics, biochemistry and environmental science. Also through the Centre for Advanced Laser Technology and Application (CALTA), CLF is responsible for laser development. DiPOLE is the brainchild of that project.

== History ==
The Vulcan is the first operational laser at the CLF. By 1997, when a new director was appointed, M. H. R. Hutchinson, formerly of Imperial College London, CLF was also operating a second laser, the Titania, at that time said to be the world brightest krypton fluoride laser.

== Current lasers ==
=== Vulcan ===
The Vulcan is the world's most powerful laser user facility. It emits a light beam in the petawatts. The construction of the core of the Vulcan was carried out by Kværner Engineering and Construction to specifications on par with those in the nuclear industry. The chamber is lined with aluminium and lead to reduce radiation.

Vulcan, initially a 0.5 terawatt two beams neodymium laser, was first upgraded in 1980 to a 6 beams 1.5 TW laser. Power was again increased in 1982, to 3 TW.

=== Astra Gemini ===
Astra Gemini is a dual-beam Titanium:Sapphire laser system. Most Ti:Sapphire lasers are single beam. The Astra Gemini has 2 amplifiers that emit 0.5 petawatt beams. The two-beam system is geared towards plasma physics experiments.

=== Artemis ===
The Artemis produces XUV light. The project was started in collaboration with the Diamond Light Source to study atomic/molecular physics, surface science, and material science. Artemis can also be used to study autoionisation dynamics and ultrafast demagnetisation.

=== ULTRA ===
By combining laser, detector and optical tweezers, ULTRA provides molecular dynamics to study physical and life sciences. The multiple arrays of ULTRA allow great flexibility to combine multiple beams across the spectrum in different timing and pulse lengths. Ultra manipulates microscopic particles suspended in liquid in such a way that the forces are not intrusive or destructive.

=== OCTOPUS ===
The OCTOPUS is an imaging cluster. Many different methods of imaging are offered there, such as multidimensional single-molecule microscopy, confocal microscopy (FLIM, FRET, and multiphoton), and optical profilometry. It operates as part of the Functional Biosystem Imaging (FBI) Group.

== External projects ==
=== HiLASE ===
In April 2013, it was announced that the CLF has won a contract from the HiLASE project. The HiLASE facility is situated in Dolní Břežany, Czech Republic. The contract is worth £10 million to CLF and the whole project costs £30 million. The bid was won thanks to the development of a high-energy diode pumped solid-state laser system (DiPOLE), which was developed by CLF scientists.

=== HiPER ===
In collaboration with laser facilities around the world, PETAL (France), OMEGA-EP (USA) and FIREX (Japan), CLF is studying the feasibility of using fast ignition to create an inertial fusion energy. The HiPER facility is planned to be constructed in Europe with panellists from 9 countries overseeing the studies.

== Notable studies ==
=== The Light Clock ===
Albert Einstein proposed as part of his theory of special relativity that light reflected from a mirror moving close to the speed of light will have higher peak power than the incident light because of temporal compression. Using a dense relativistic electron mirror created from a high-intensity laser pulse and nanometre-scale foil, the frequency of the laser pulse was shown to shift coherently from infrared to the ultraviolet. The results elucidate the reflection process of laser-generated electron mirrors and suggest future research in relativistic mirrors.

=== DiPOLE ===
It was not previously possible to combine high pulse energy with high repetition rate. The Vulcan was a high pulse, low repetition (in order of pulse per hour) laser. Others, while they can put out many pulses per second, were limited to lower energy. DiPOLE will enable combination of the two.
