= Potassium titanyl phosphate =

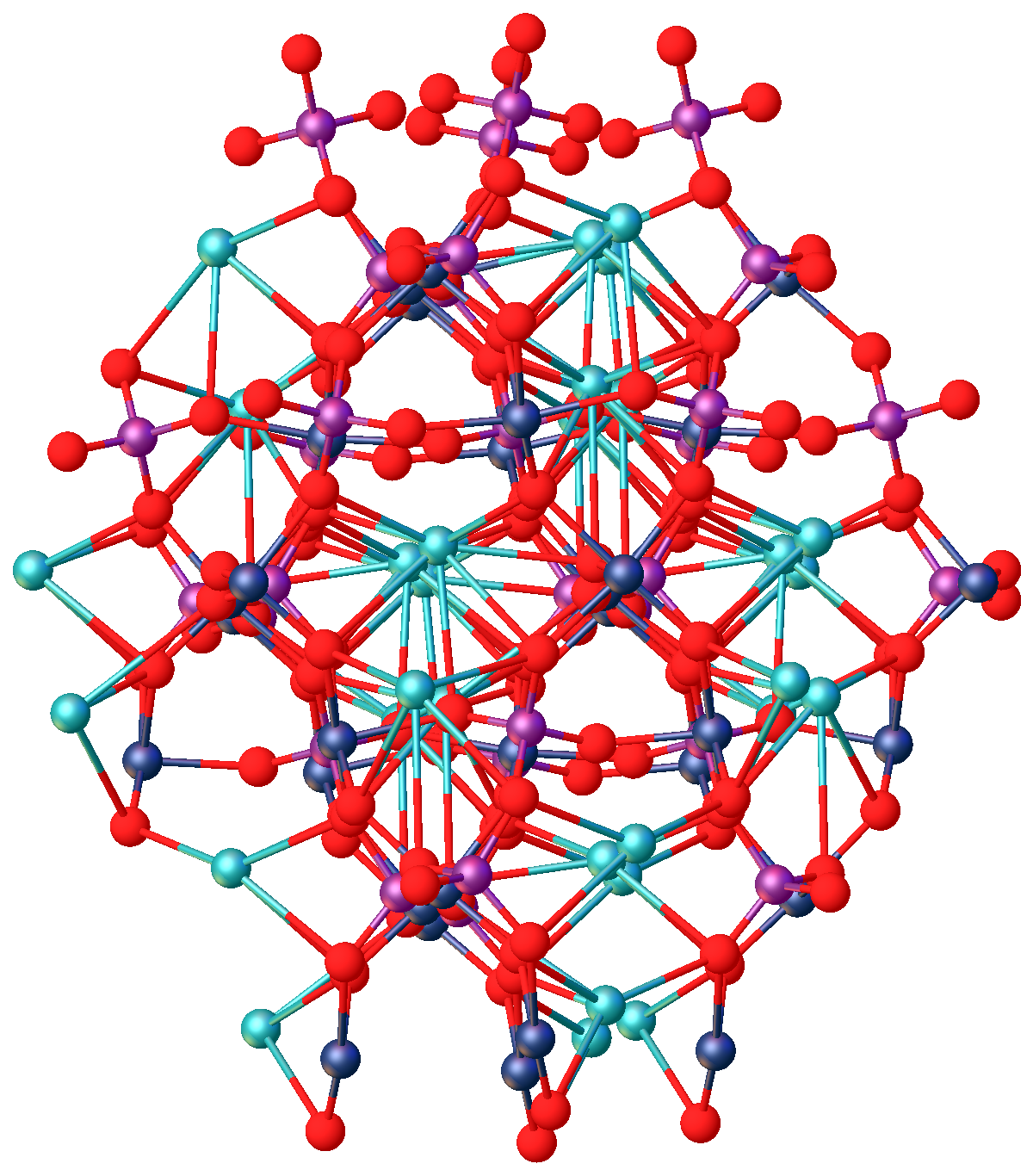

Names
- Other names KTP

Identifiers
| CAS Number | 12690-20-9 |
| 3D model (JSmol) | Interactive image |
| ChemSpider | 50645143 |
| PubChem CID | 102601599 |
| CompTox Dashboard (EPA) | DTXSID50925734 |
- InChI: InChI=1S/K.H3O4P.O.Ti/c;1-5(2,3)4;;/h;(H3,1,2,3,4);;/q+1;;;+2/p-3 Key: SALUEWWYAZZYMC-UHFFFAOYSA-K
- SMILES: [O-]P(=O)([O-])[O-].O=[Ti+2].[K+]

Properties
| Chemical formula | K[TiO]PO_{4} |
| Molar mass | 197.934 g·mol^{−1} |
| Appearance | colorless solid |
| Density | 3.026 g/cm^{3} |
- Except where otherwise noted, data are given for materials in their standard state (at 25 °C [77 °F], 100 kPa). Infobox references

Potassium titanyl phosphate (KTP) is an inorganic compound with the formula K^{+}[TiO]^{2+}PO^{3−}_{4}. It is a white solid. KTP is an important nonlinear optical (NLO) material that is commonly used for frequency-doubling diode-pumped solid-state lasers such as Nd:YAG and other neodymium-doped lasers. Related NLO materials include lithium niobate, ammonium dihydrogenphosphate, and potassium dihydrogenphosphate.

== Synthesis and structure ==
The compound is prepared by the reaction of titanium dioxide with a mixture of KH_{2}PO_{4} and K_{2}HPO_{4} near 1300 K. The potassium salts serve both as reagents and flux.

The material has been characterized by X-ray crystallography. KTP has an orthorhombic crystal structure. It features octahedral Ti(IV) and tetrahedral phosphate sites. Potassium has a high coordination number. All heavy atoms (Ti, P, K) are linked exclusively by oxides, which interconnect these atoms.

== Operational aspects ==
Crystals of KTP are highly transparent for wavelengths between 350 and 2700 nm with a reduced transmission out to 4500 nm where the crystal is effectively opaque. Its second-harmonic generation (SHG) coefficient is about three times higher than KDP. It has a Mohs hardness of about 5.

KTP is also used as an optical parametric oscillator for near IR generation up to 4 μm. It is particularly suited to high power operation as an optical parametric oscillator due to its high damage threshold and large crystal aperture. The high degree of birefringent walk-off between the pump signal and idler beams present in this material limit its use as an optical parametric oscillator for very low power applications.

The material has a relatively high threshold to optical damage (~15 J/cm^{2}), an excellent optical nonlinearity and excellent thermal stability in theory. In practice, KTP crystals need to have stable temperature to operate if they are pumped with 1064 nm (infrared, to output 532 nm green). However, it is prone to photochromic damage (called grey tracking) during high-power 1064 nm second-harmonic generation which tends to limit its use to low- and mid-power systems.

Other such materials include potassium titanyl arsenate (KTiOAsO_{4}).

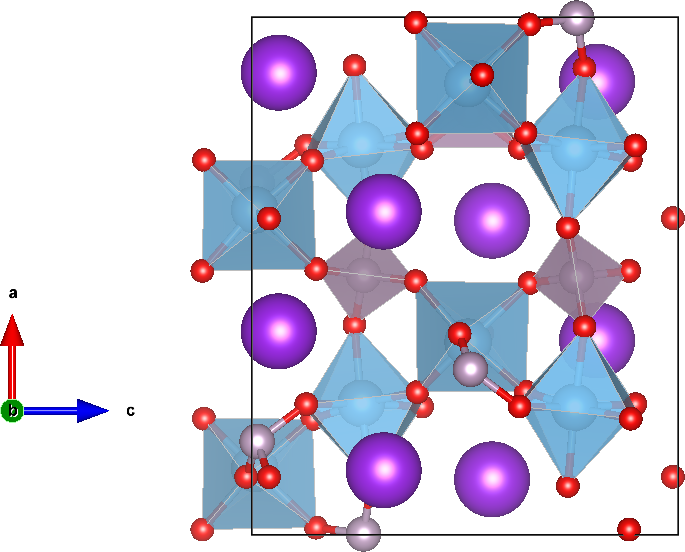
Structure of KTP viewed down b axis. Color code: red = O, purple = K, light blue = Ti, pink = P).

KTP crystals exhibit ionic conductivity, primarily along the c-axis, resulting from the mobility of potassium ions (K+) through the crystal lattice via a vacancy-hopping mechanism. This ionic conductivity is linked to the formation of "grey tracks"—a form of photochromic damage—observed during high-power laser irradiation. Research indicates that the creation of these tracks involves the trapping of charge carriers at vacancy sites, a process that can be partially mitigated through specialized bleaching treatments.

== Some applications ==
It is used to produce "greenlight" to perform some laser prostate surgery. KTP crystals coupled with Nd:YAG or Nd:YVO_{4} crystals are commonly found in green laser pointers.

KTP is also used as an electro-optic modulator, optical waveguide material, and in directional couplers.

== Periodically poled potassium titanyl phosphate (PPKTP) ==
Periodically poled potassium titanyl phosphate (PPKTP) consists of KTP with switched domain regions within the crystal for various nonlinear optic applications and frequency conversion. It can be wavelength tailored for efficient second-harmonic generation, sum-frequency generation, and difference frequency generation. The interactions in PPKTP are based upon quasi-phase-matching, achieved by periodic poling of the crystal, whereby a structure of regularly spaced ferroelectric domains with alternating orientations are created in the material.

PPKTP is commonly used for Type 1 & 2 frequency conversions for pump wavelengths of 730–3500 nm.

Other materials used for periodic poling are wide band gap inorganic crystals like lithium niobate (resulting in periodically poled lithium niobate, PPLN), lithium tantalate, and some organic materials.

== See also ==
Other materials used for laser frequency doubling are

- Lithium triborate (LBO), used for high output power green or blue DPSS lasers
- Beta barium borate (BBO), used for high output power DPSS blue lasers
