= Optical parametric oscillator =

Parametric oscillator that oscillates at optical frequencies

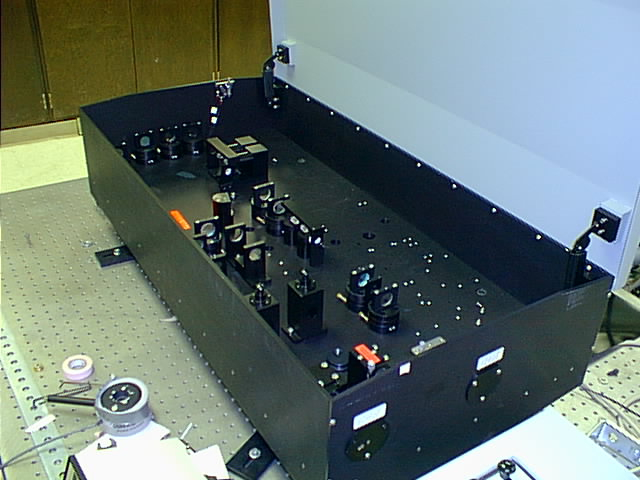
Infrared optical parametric oscillator

An optical parametric oscillator (OPO) is a parametric oscillator that oscillates at optical frequencies. It converts an input laser wave (called "pump") with frequency $\omega_p$ into two output waves of lower frequency ($\omega_s, \omega_i$) by means of second-order nonlinear optical interaction. The sum of the output waves' frequencies is equal to the input wave frequency: $\omega_s + \omega_i=\omega_p$. For historical reasons, the two output waves are called "signal" and "idler", where the output wave with higher frequency is the "signal". A special case is the degenerate OPO, when the output frequency is one-half the pump frequency, $\omega_s=\omega_i=\omega_p/2$, which can result in half-harmonic generation when signal and idler have the same polarization.

The first optical parametric oscillator was demonstrated by Joseph A. Giordmaine and Robert C. Miller in 1965, five years after the invention of the laser, at Bell Labs. Optical parametric oscillators are used as coherent light sources for various scientific purposes, and to generate squeezed light for quantum mechanics research. A Soviet report was also published in 1965.

== Overview ==
The OPO consists essentially of an optical resonator and a nonlinear optical crystal. The optical resonator serves to resonate at least one of signal and idler waves. In the nonlinear optical crystal, the pump, signal and idler waves overlap. The interaction between these three waves leads to amplitude gain for signal and idler waves (parametric amplification) and a corresponding deamplification of the pump wave. The gain allows the resonating wave(s) (signal or idler or both) to oscillate in the resonator, compensating the loss that the resonating wave(s) experience(s) at each round-trip. This loss includes the loss due to outcoupling by one of the resonator mirrors, which provides the desired output wave. Since the (relative) loss is independent of the pump power, but the gain is dependent on pump power, at low pump power there is insufficient gain to support oscillation. Oscillation occurs only when the pump power exceeds a threshold. Above the threshold, the gain depends also on the amplitude of the resonated wave. Thus, in steady-state operation, the amplitude of the resonated wave is determined by the condition that this gain equals the (constant) loss. The circulating amplitude increases with increasing pump power, and so does the output power.

The photon conversion efficiency, the number of output photons per unit time in the output signal or idler wave relative to number of pump photons incident per unit time into the OPO can be high, in the range of tens of percent. Typical threshold pump power is between tens of milliwatts to several watts, depending on losses of the resonator, the frequencies of the interacting light, the intensity in the nonlinear material, and its nonlinearity. An output power of several watts can be achieved. There exist both continuous-wave and pulsed OPOs. The latter are easier to build; since the pulses last only for a tiny fraction of a second, they incur less damage on the nonlinear optical material and the mirrors than a continuous high intensity beam.

In the optical parametric oscillator the initial idler and signal waves are taken from background waves, which are always present. If the idler wave is given from the outside along with the pump beam, then the process is called difference frequency generation (DFG). This is a more efficient process than optical parametric oscillation, and in principle can be thresholdless.

In order to change the output wave frequencies, one can change the pump frequency or the phasematching properties of the nonlinear optical crystal. This latter is accomplished by changing its temperature or orientation or quasi-phasematching period (see below). For fine-tuning one can also change the optical path length of the resonator. In addition, the resonator may contain elements to suppress mode-hops of the resonating wave. This often requires active control of some element of the OPO system.

If the nonlinear optical crystal cannot be phase-matched, quasi-phase-matching (QPM) can be employed. This is accomplished by periodically changing the nonlinear optical properties of the crystal, mostly by periodical poling. With a suitable range of periods, output wavelengths from 700 nm to 5000 nm can be generated in periodically poled lithium niobate (PPLN). Common pump sources are neodymium lasers at 1064 nm or 532 nm.

An important feature of the OPO is the coherence and the spectral width of the generated radiation. When the pump power is significantly above threshold, the two output waves are, to a very good approximation, coherent states (laser-like waves). The linewidth of the resonated wave is very narrow (as low as several kHz). The nonresonated generated wave also exhibits narrow linewidth if a pump wave of narrow linewidth is employed. Narrow-linewidth OPOs are widely used in spectroscopy.

== Quantum properties of the generated light beams ==
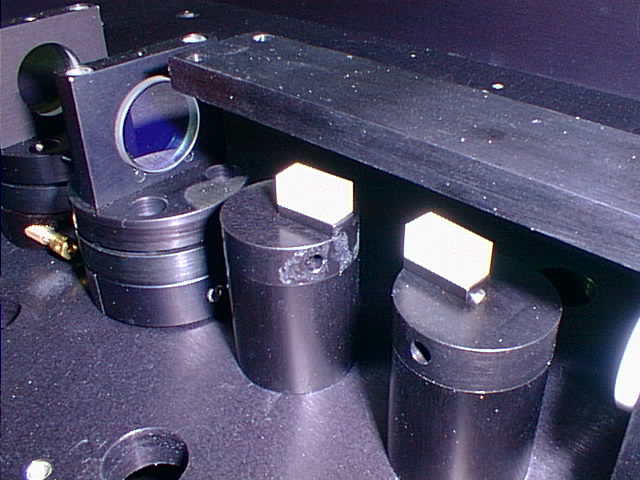
KTP crystals in an OPO

The OPO is the physical system most widely used to generate squeezed coherent states and entangled states of light in the continuous variables regime. Many demonstrations of quantum information protocols for continuous variables were realized using OPOs.

The downconversion process really occurs in the single photon regime: each pump photon that is annihilated inside the cavity gives rise to a pair of photons in the signal and idler intracavity modes. This leads to a quantum correlation between the intensities of signal and idler fields, so that there is squeezing in the subtraction of intensities, which motivated the name "twin beams" for the downconverted fields. The highest squeezing level attained to date is 15 dB.

It turns out that the phases of the twin beams are quantum correlated as well, leading to entanglement, theoretically predicted in 1988. Below threshold, entanglement was measured for the first time in 1992, and in 2005 above threshold.

Above threshold, the pump beam depletion makes it sensitive to the quantum phenomena happening inside the crystal. The first measurement of squeezing in the pump field after parametric interaction was done in 1997. It has been recently predicted that all three fields (pump, signal and idler) must be entangled, a prediction which was experimentally demonstrated by the same group.

Not only intensity and phase of the twin beams share quantum correlations, but also do their spatial modes. This feature could be used to enhance signal to noise ratio in image systems and hence surpass the standard quantum limit (or the shot noise limit) for imaging.

== Applications ==
The OPO is being employed nowadays as a source of squeezed light tuned to atomic transitions, in order to study how the atoms interact with squeezed light.

It was demonstrated in 2012 that a degenerate OPO can be used as an all-optical quantum random number generator that does not require post processing.

== See also ==
- Nonlinear optics
- Optical parametric amplifier
