= Parametric oscillator =

Harmonic oscillator whose parameters oscillate in time

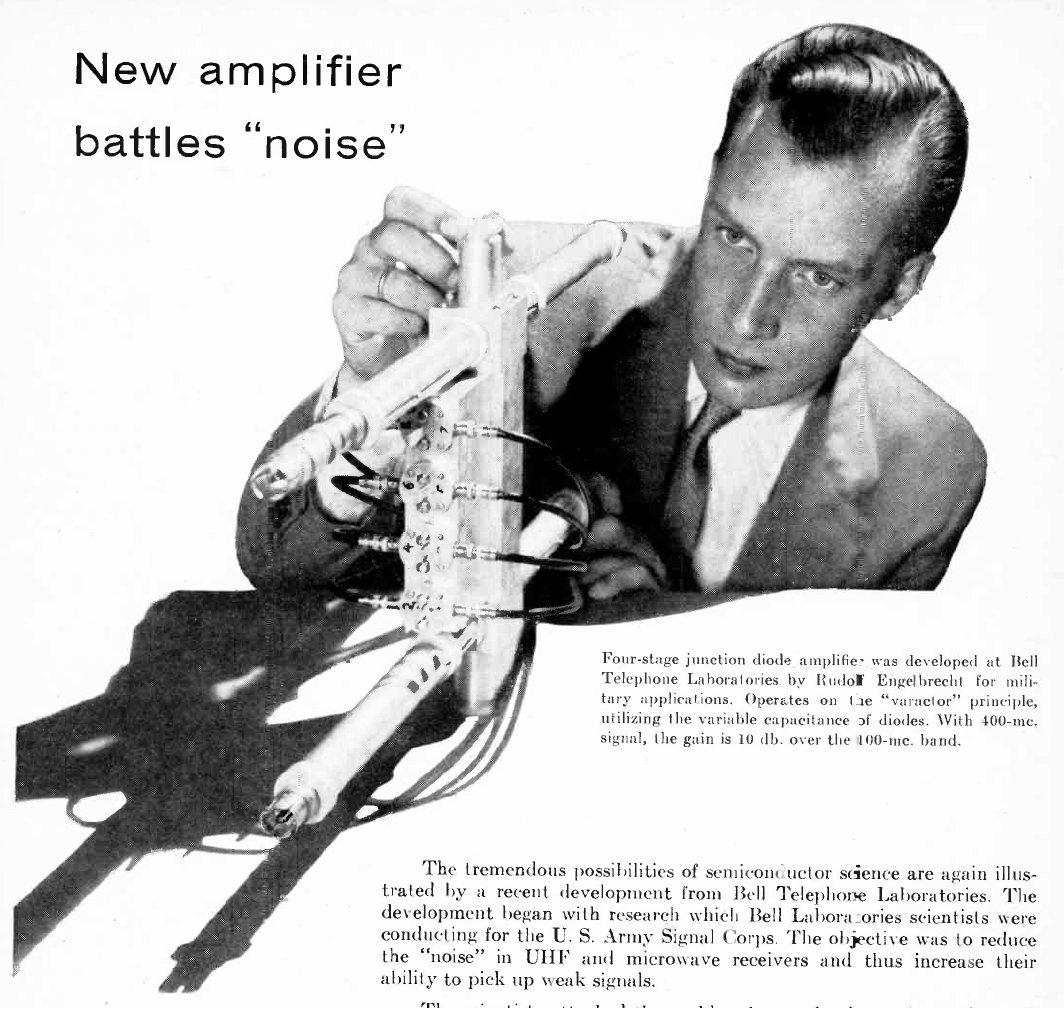
One of the first varactor parametric amplifiers, invented at Bell Labs around 1958. This 4 stage amplifier achieved 10 dB gain at 400 MHz. Parametric amplifiers are used in applications requiring extremely low noise.

A parametric oscillator is a driven harmonic oscillator in which the oscillations are driven by varying some parameters of the system at some frequencies, typically different from the natural frequency of the oscillator. A simple example of a parametric oscillator is a child pumping a playground swing by periodically standing and squatting to increase the size of the swing's oscillations. The child's motions vary the moment of inertia of the swing as a pendulum. The "pump" motions of the child must be at twice the frequency of the swing's oscillations. Examples of parameters that may be varied are the oscillator's resonance frequency $\omega$ and damping $\beta$.

Parametric oscillators are used in several areas of physics. The classical varactor parametric oscillator consists of a semiconductor varactor diode connected to a resonant circuit or cavity resonator. It is driven by varying the diode's capacitance by applying a varying bias voltage. The circuit that varies the diode's capacitance is called the "pump" or "driver". In microwave electronics, waveguide/YAG-based parametric oscillators operate in the same fashion. Another important example is the optical parametric oscillator, which converts an input laser light wave into two output waves of lower frequency ($\omega_s, \omega_i$).

When operated at pump levels below oscillation, the parametric oscillator can amplify a signal, forming a parametric amplifier (paramp). Varactor parametric amplifiers were developed as low-noise amplifiers in the radio and microwave frequency range. The advantage of a parametric amplifier is that it has much lower noise than an amplifier based on a gain device like a transistor or vacuum tube. This is because in the parametric amplifier a reactance is varied instead of a (noise-producing) resistance. They are used in very low noise radio receivers in radio telescopes and spacecraft communication antennas.

Parametric resonance occurs in a mechanical system when a system is parametrically excited and oscillates at one of its resonant frequencies. Parametric excitation differs from forcing since the action appears as a time varying modification on a system parameter.

== History ==
Parametric oscillations were first noticed in mechanics. Michael Faraday (1831) was the first to notice oscillations of one frequency being excited by forces of double the frequency, in the crispations (ruffled surface waves) observed in a wine glass excited to "sing". Franz Melde (1860) generated parametric oscillations in a string by employing a tuning fork to periodically vary the tension at twice the resonance frequency of the string. Parametric oscillation was first treated as a general phenomenon by Rayleigh (1883,1887).

One of the first to apply the concept to electric circuits was George Francis FitzGerald, who in 1892 tried to excite oscillations in an LC circuit by pumping it with a varying inductance provided by a dynamo. Parametric amplifiers (paramps) were first used in 1913-1915 for radio telephony from Berlin to Vienna and Moscow, and were predicted to have a useful future (Ernst Alexanderson, 1916). These early parametric amplifiers used the nonlinearity of an iron-core inductor, so they could only function at low frequencies.

In 1948 Aldert van der Ziel pointed out a major advantage of the parametric amplifier: because it used a variable reactance instead of a resistance for amplification it had inherently low noise. A parametric amplifier used as the front end of a radio receiver could amplify a weak signal while introducing very little noise. In 1952 Harrison Rowe at Bell Labs extended some 1934 mathematical work on pumped oscillations by Jack Manley and published the modern mathematical theory of parametric oscillations, the Manley-Rowe relations.

The varactor diode invented in 1956 had a nonlinear capacitance that was usable into microwave frequencies. The varactor parametric amplifier was developed by Marion Hines in 1956 at Western Electric. At the time it was invented microwaves were just being exploited, and the varactor amplifier was the first semiconductor amplifier at microwave frequencies. It was applied to low noise radio receivers in many areas, and has been widely used in radio telescopes, satellite ground stations, and long-range radar. It is the main type of parametric amplifier used today. Since that time parametric amplifiers have been built with other nonlinear active devices such as Josephson junctions.

The technique has been extended to optical frequencies in optical parametric oscillators and amplifiers which use nonlinear crystals as the active element.

== Mathematical analysis ==
A parametric oscillator is a harmonic oscillator whose physical properties vary with time. The equation of such an oscillator is

$$\frac{d^{2}x}{dt^{2}} + \beta(t) \frac{dx}{dt} + \omega^{2}(t) x = 0$$

This equation is linear in $x(t)$. By assumption, the parameters $\omega^{2}$ and $\beta$ depend only on time and do not depend on the state of the oscillator. In general, $\beta(t)$ and/or $\omega^{2}(t)$ are assumed to vary periodically, with the same period $T$.

If the parameters vary at roughly twice the natural frequency of the oscillator (defined below), the oscillator phase-locks to the parametric variation and absorbs energy at a rate proportional to the energy it already has. Without a compensating energy-loss mechanism provided by $\beta$, the oscillation amplitude grows exponentially. (This phenomenon is called parametric excitation, parametric resonance or parametric pumping.) However, if the initial amplitude is zero, it will remain so; this distinguishes it from the non-parametric resonance of driven simple harmonic oscillators, in which the amplitude grows linearly in time regardless of the initial state.

A familiar experience of both parametric and driven oscillation is playing on a swing. Rocking back and forth pumps the swing as a driven harmonic oscillator, but once moving, the swing can also be parametrically driven by alternately standing and squatting at key points in the swing arc. This changes moment of inertia of the swing and hence the resonance frequency, and children can quickly reach large amplitudes provided that they have some amplitude to start with (e.g., get a push). Standing and squatting at rest, however, leads nowhere.

=== Transformation of the equation ===
We begin by making a change of variable

$$q(t) \ \stackrel{\mathrm{def}}{=}\ e^{D(t)} x(t)$$

where $D(t)$ is the time integral of the damping coefficient

$$D(t) \ \stackrel{\mathrm{def}}{=}\ \frac{1}{2} \int_{0}^{t} \beta(\tau) \, d\tau$$.

This change of variable eliminates the damping term in the differential equation, reducing it to

$$\frac{d^{2}q}{dt^{2}} + \Omega^{2}(t) q = 0$$

where the transformed frequency is defined as

$$\Omega^{2}(t) \ \stackrel{\mathrm{def}}{=}\ \omega^{2}(t) - \frac{1}{2} \frac{d\beta}{dt} - \frac{1}{4} \beta^{2}(t)$$.

In general, the variations in damping and frequency are relatively small perturbations

$$\beta(t) = \omega_{0} \big[b + g(t) \big]$$
$$\omega^{2}(t) = \omega_{0}^{2} \big[1 + h(t) \big]$$

where $\omega_{0}$ and $b$ are constants, namely, the time-averaged oscillator frequency and damping, respectively. The transformed frequency can then be written in a similar way as

$$\Omega^{2}(t) = \omega_{n}^{2} \big[1 + f(t) \big]$$,

where $\omega_{n}$ is the natural frequency of the damped harmonic oscillator

$$\omega_{n}^{2} \ \stackrel{\mathrm{def}}{=}\ \omega_{0}^{2} \left( 1 - \frac{b^{2}}{4} \right)$$

and

$$f(t) \ \stackrel{\mathrm{def}}{=}\ \frac{\omega_{0}^{2}}{\omega_{n}^{2}} \left[ h(t) - \frac{1}{2\omega_{0}} \frac{dg}{dt} - \frac{b}{2} g(t) - \frac{1}{4} g^{2}(t) \right]$$.

Thus, our transformed equation can be written as

$$\frac{d^{2}q}{dt^{2}} + \omega_{n}^{2} \big[1 + f(t) \big] q = 0$$.

The independent variations $g(t)$ and $h(t)$ in the oscillator damping and resonance frequency, respectively, can be combined into a single pumping function $f(t)$. The converse conclusion is that any form of parametric excitation can be accomplished by varying either the resonance frequency or the damping, or both.

=== Solution of the transformed equation ===
Let us assume that $\ f(t)\$ is sinusoidal with a frequency approximately twice the natural frequency of the oscillator:

$$f(t) = f_{0} \sin (2\omega_{p}t)$$

where the pumping frequency $\ \omega_{p} \approx \omega_{n}\$ but need not equal $\ \omega_{n}\$ exactly. Using the method of variation of parameters, the solution $\ q(t)\$ to our transformed equation may be written as

$$\ q(t)\ =\ A(t)\ \cos (\omega_{p} t)\ +\ B(t)\ \sin (\omega_{p} t)\$$

where the rapidly varying components, $\ \cos (\omega_{p}t)\$ and $\ \sin (\omega_{p}t)\ ,$ have been factored out to isolate the slowly varying amplitudes $\ A(t)\$ and $\ B(t) ~.$

We proceed by substituting this solution into the differential equation and considering that both the coefficients in front of $\ \cos (\omega_{p}t)\$ and $\ \sin (\omega_{p}t)\$ must be zero to satisfy the differential equation identically. We also omit the second derivatives of $\ A(t)\$ and $\ B(t)\$ on the grounds that $\ A(t)\$ and $\ B(t)\$ are slowly varying, as well as omit sinusoidal terms not near the natural frequency, $\ \omega_{n}\ ,$ as they do not contribute significantly to resonance. The result is the following pair of coupled differential equations:

$$2 \omega_{p} \frac{\ \operatorname d A\ }{\operatorname d t } = \frac{1}{2} f_0\ \omega_{n}^{2}\ A - \left( \omega_{p}^{2} - \omega_{n}^{2} \right)\ B\ ,$$

$$2\omega_{p} \frac{\ \operatorname d B\ }{\operatorname d t } = \left( \omega_{p}^{2} - \omega_{n}^{2} \right)\ A - \frac{1}{2} f_0\ \omega_{n}^{2}\ B ~.$$

This system of linear differential equations with constant coefficients can be decoupled and solved by eigenvalue/eigenvector methods. This yields the solution

$$\begin{bmatrix}
A(t) \\ B(t)
\end{bmatrix} = c_1\ \vec{V_1}\ e^{\lambda_1 t} + c_2\ \vec{V_2}\ e^{\lambda_2 t}$$

where $\ \lambda_1\$ and $\ \lambda_2\$ are the eigenvalues of the matrix

$$\frac{ 1 }{\ 2 \omega_p\ }\begin{bmatrix}
\frac{1}{2} f_0\ \omega_{n}^{2} & - \left( \omega_{p}^{2} - \omega_{n}^{2} \right) \\
+ \left( \omega_{p}^{2} - \omega_{n}^{2} \right) & -\frac{1}{2} f_0\ \omega_{n}^{2}
\end{bmatrix}\ ,$$

$\ \vec{V_1}\$ and $\ \vec{V_2}\$ are corresponding eigenvectors, and $\ c_1\$ and $\ c_2\$ are arbitrary constants.

The eigenvalues are given by

$$\lambda_{1,2} = \pm \frac{ 1 }{\ 2 \omega_p\ } \sqrt{\Bigl( \tfrac{ 1 }{ 2 } f_0\ \omega_n^2 \Bigr)^2 - \Bigl( \omega_{p}^{2} - \omega_{n}^{2} \Bigr)^2 \;} ~.$$

If we write the difference between $\ \omega_p\$ and $\ \omega_n\$ as $\ \Delta \omega = \omega_p - \omega_n\ ,$ and replace $\ \omega_p\$ with $\omega_n$ everywhere where the difference is not important, we get

$$\lambda_{1,2} = \pm \sqrt{\Bigl( \tfrac{ 1 }{ 4 }f_0\ \omega_n \Bigr)^2 - \Bigl( \Delta \omega \Bigr)^2 \;}$$.

If $\ \bigl| \Delta \omega \bigr| < \tfrac{ 1 }{ 4 } f_0\ \omega_n\ ,$ then the eigenvalues are real and exactly one is positive, which leads to exponential growth for $\ A(t)\$ and $\ B(t) ~.$ This is the condition for parametric resonance, with the growth rate for $\ q(t)\$ given by the positive eigenvalue $\ \lambda_1 = + \sqrt{ \Bigl(\tfrac{1}{4} f_0\ \omega_n \Bigr)^2 - \Bigl( \Delta \omega \Bigr)^2 \;} ~.$

Note, however, that this growth rate corresponds to the amplitude of the transformed variable $\ q(t)\ ,$ whereas the amplitude of the original, untransformed variable $\ x(t) = q(t)\ e^{-D(t)}\$ can either grow or decay depending on whether $\ \lambda_1 t - D(\ t\ )\$ is an increasing or decreasing function of time, $\ t ~.$

=== Intuitive derivation of parametric excitation ===
The above derivation may seem like a mathematical sleight-of-hand, so it may be helpful to give an intuitive derivation. The $q$ equation may be written in the form

$$\frac{d^{2}q}{dt^{2}} + \omega_{n}^{2} q = -\omega_{n}^{2} f(t) q$$

which represents a simple harmonic oscillator (or, alternatively, a bandpass filter) being driven by a signal $-\omega_{n}^{2} f(t) q$ that is proportional to its response $q(t)$.

Assume that $q(t) = A \cos (\omega_{p} t)$ already has an oscillation at frequency $\omega_{p}$ and that the pumping $f(t) = f_{0} \sin (2\omega_{p}t)$ has double the frequency and a small amplitude $f_{0} \ll 1$. Applying a trigonometric identity for products of sinusoids, their product $q(t)f(t)$ produces two driving signals, one at frequency $\omega_{p}$ and the other at frequency $3 \omega_{p}$.

$$f(t)q(t) = \frac{f_{0}}{2} A \big[ \sin (\omega_{p} t) + \sin (3\omega_{p} t) \big]$$

Being off-resonance, the $3\omega_{p}$ signal is attenuated and can be neglected initially. By contrast, the $\omega_{p}$ signal is on resonance, serves to amplify $q(t)$, and is proportional to the amplitude $A$. Hence, the amplitude of $q(t)$ grows exponentially unless it is initially zero.

Expressed in Fourier space, the multiplication $f(t)q(t)$ is a convolution of their Fourier transforms $\tilde{F}(\omega)$ and $\tilde{Q}(\omega)$. The positive feedback arises because the $+2\omega_{p}$ component of $f(t)$ converts the $-\omega_{p}$ component of $q(t)$ into a driving signal at $+\omega_{p}$, and vice versa (reverse the signs). This explains why the pumping frequency must be near $2\omega_{n}$, twice the natural frequency of the oscillator. Pumping at a grossly different frequency would not couple (i.e., provide mutual positive feedback) between the $-\omega_{p}$ and $+\omega_{p}$ components of $q(t)$.

== Parametric resonance ==
Parametric resonance is the parametrical resonance phenomenon of mechanical perturbation and oscillation at certain frequencies (and the associated harmonics). This effect is different from regular resonance because it exhibits the instability phenomenon.

Parametric resonance occurs in a mechanical system when a system is parametrically excited and oscillates at one of its resonant frequencies. Parametric excitation differs from forcing since the action appears as a time varying modification on a system parameter. The classical example of parametric resonance is that of the vertically forced pendulum, such as the botafumeiro. Parametric resonance takes place when the external excitation frequency equals twice the natural frequency of the system divided by a positive integer $n$. For a parametric excitation with small amplitude $h$ in the absence of friction, the bandwidth of the resonance is to leading order $\mathcal O(|h|^n)$. The effect of friction is to introduce a finite threshold for the amplitude of parametric excitation to result in an instability.

For small amplitudes and by linearising, the stability of the periodic solution is given by Mathieu's equation:

$$\ddot{u} + (a + B \cos t)u =0$$

where $u$ is some perturbation from the periodic solution. Here the $B\ \cos(t)$ term acts as an ‘energy’ source and is said to parametrically excite the system. The Mathieu equation describes many other physical systems to a sinusoidal parametric excitation such as an LC Circuit where the capacitor plates move sinusoidally.

Autoparametric resonance happens in a system with two coupled oscillators, such that the vibrations of one act as parametric resonance on the second. The zero point of the second oscillator becomes unstable, and thus it starts oscillating.

== Parametric amplifiers ==
=== Introduction ===
A parametric amplifier is implemented as a mixer. The mixer's gain shows up in the output as amplifier gain. The input weak signal is mixed with a strong local oscillator signal, and the resultant strong output is used in the ensuing receiver stages.

Parametric amplifiers also operate by changing a parameter of the amplifier. Intuitively, this can be understood as follows, for a variable capacitor-based amplifier. Charge $Q$ in a capacitor obeys: $Q = C \times V$,
therefore the voltage across is $V = \frac{Q}{C}$.

Knowing the above, if a capacitor is charged until its voltage equals the sampled voltage of an incoming weak signal, and if the capacitor's capacitance is then reduced (say, by manually moving the plates further apart), then the voltage across the capacitor will increase. In this way, the voltage of the weak signal is amplified.

If the capacitor is a varicap diode, then "moving the plates" can be done simply by applying time-varying DC voltage to the varicap diode. This driving voltage usually comes from another oscillator—sometimes called a "pump".

The resulting output signal contains frequencies that are the sum and difference of the input signal (f1) and the pump signal (f2): (f1 + f2) and (f1 − f2).

A practical parametric oscillator needs the following connections: one for the "common" or "ground", one to feed the pump, one to retrieve the output, and maybe a fourth one for biasing. A parametric amplifier needs a fifth port to input the signal being amplified. Since a varactor diode has only two connections, it can only be a part of an LC network with four eigenvectors with nodes at the connections. This can be implemented as a transimpedance amplifier, a traveling-wave amplifier or by means of a circulator.

=== Mathematical equation ===
The parametric oscillator equation can be extended by adding an external driving force $E(t)$:

$$\frac{d^{2}x}{dt^{2}} + \beta(t) \frac{dx}{dt} + \omega^{2}(t) x = E(t)$$.

We assume that the damping $D$ is sufficiently strong that, in the absence of the driving force $E$, the amplitude of the parametric oscillations does not diverge, i.e., that $\alpha t < D$. In this situation, the parametric pumping acts to lower the effective damping in the system. For illustration, let the damping be constant $\beta(t) = \omega_{0} b$ and assume that the external driving force is at the mean resonance frequency $\omega_{0}$, i.e., $E(t) = E_{0} \sin \omega_{0} t$. The equation becomes

$$\frac{d^{2}x}{dt^{2}} + b \omega_{0} \frac{dx}{dt} + \omega_{0}^{2} \left[1 + h_{0} \sin 2\omega_{0} t \right] x = E_{0} \sin \omega_{0} t$$

whose solution is approximately

$$x(t) = \frac{2E_{0}}{\omega_{0}^{2} \left( 2b - h_{0} \right)} \cos \omega_{0} t$$.

As $h_{0}$ approaches the threshold $2b$, the amplitude diverges. When $h_0 \geq 2b$, the system enters parametric resonance and the amplitude begins to grow exponentially, even in the absence of a driving force $E(t)$.

=== Advantages ===
1. It is highly sensitive
2. low noise level amplifier for ultra high frequency and microwave radio signal

=== Other relevant mathematical results ===
If the parameters of any second-order linear differential equation are varied periodically, Floquet analysis shows that the solutions must vary either sinusoidally or exponentially.

The $q$ equation above with periodically varying $f(t)$ is an example of a Hill equation. If $f(t)$ is a simple sinusoid, the equation is called a Mathieu equation.

== See also ==
- Harmonic oscillator
- Mathieu equation
- Optical parametric amplifier
- Optical parametric oscillator
