= Periodic poling =

Type of layer formation in an optical material

Periodic poling is a formation of layers with alternate orientation in a birefringent material. The domains are regularly spaced, with period in a multiple of the desired wavelength of operation. The structure is designed to achieve quasi-phase-matching (QPM) in the material.

Periodically poled crystals are frequently used as nonlinear optical materials. They are more efficient at second-harmonic generation than crystals of the same material without periodic structure. The material for the crystals is usually a wide-bandgap inorganic crystal, or in some cases a suitable organic polymer. Some popular materials in current use are potassium titanyl phosphate (KTP), lithium niobate, and lithium tantalate.

The periodic structure is created in the crystal using a range of techniques. Pulsed electric field, electron bombardment, thermal pulsing, or other methods can be used to reposition the atoms in the lattice, creating oriented domains. This can be achieved either during the growth of the crystal or subsequently.

== See also ==
- Glass poling
