= Glass fiber =

Material consisting of numerous extremely fine fibers of glass

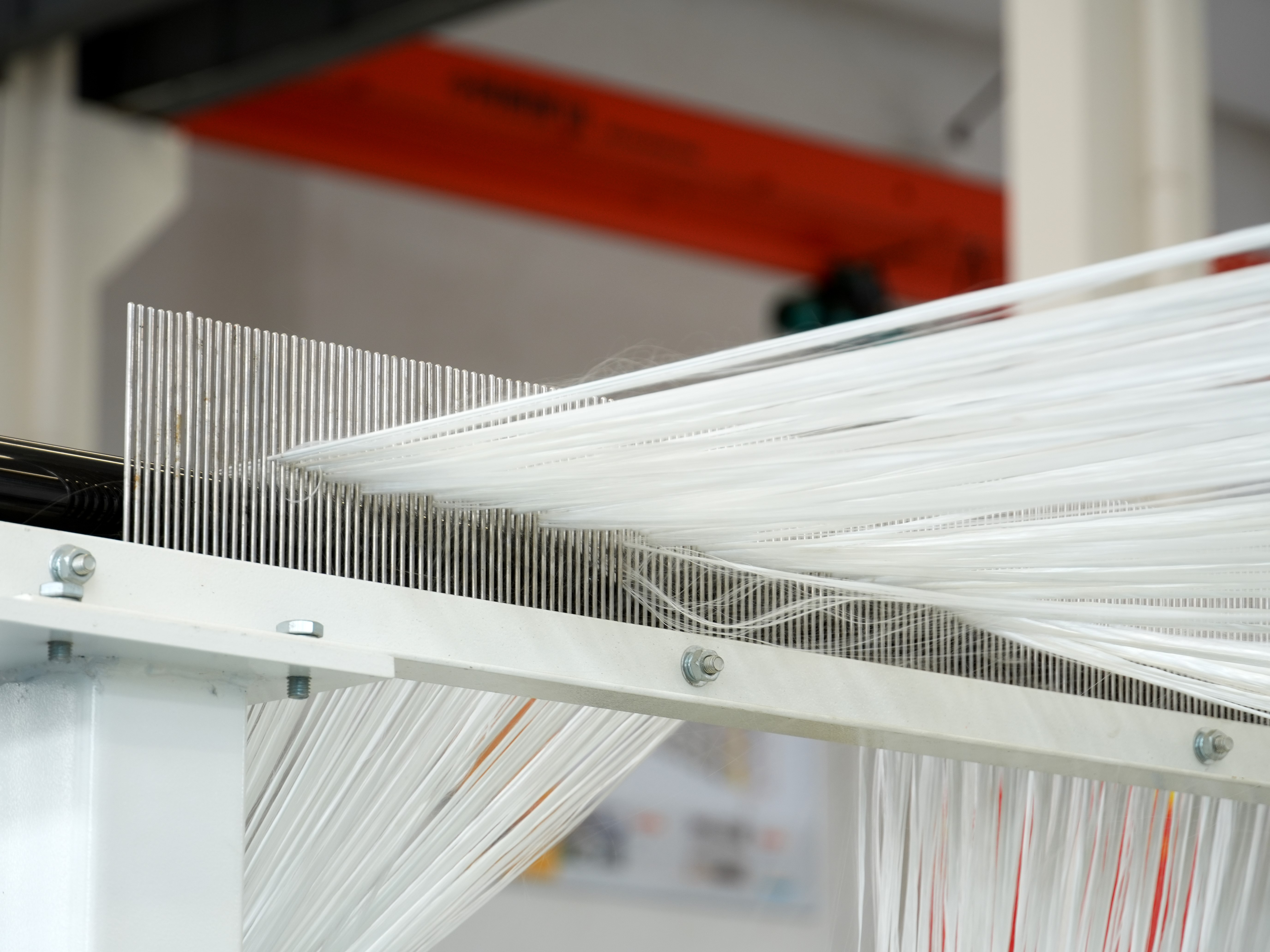
glass fiber bundle

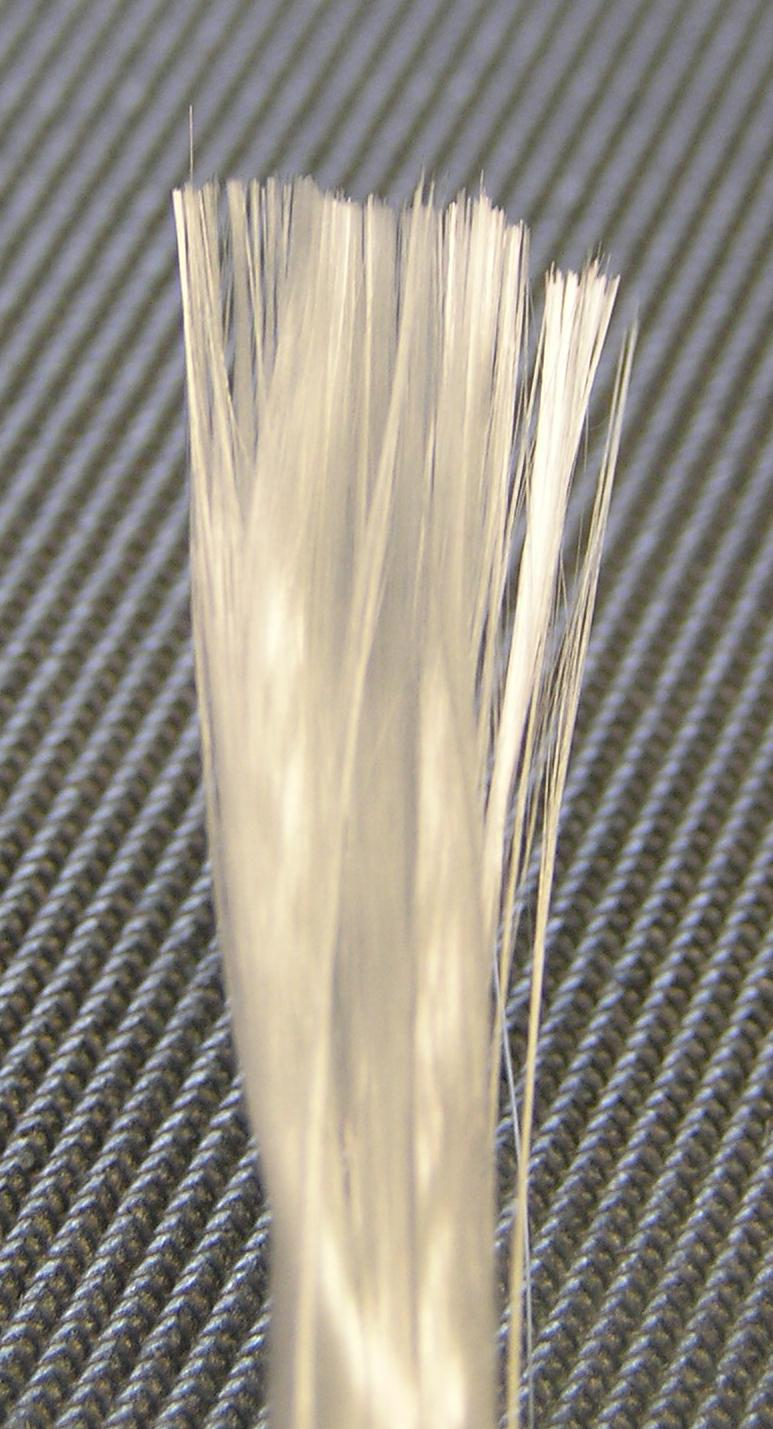
Bundle of glass fibers

Glass fiber (or glass fibre) is a material consisting of numerous extremely fine fibers of glass.

Glassmakers throughout history have experimented with glass fibers, but mass manufacture of glass fiber was only made possible with the invention of finer machine tooling. In 1893, Edward Drummond Libbey exhibited a dress at the World's Columbian Exposition incorporating glass fibers with the diameter and texture of silk fibers. Glass fibers can also occur naturally, as Pele's hair.

Glass wool, which is one product called "fiberglass" today, was invented some time between 1932 and 1933 by Games Slayter of Owens-Illinois, as a material to be used as thermal building insulation. It is marketed under the trade name Fiberglass, which has become a genericized trademark. Glass fiber, when used as a thermal insulating material, is specially manufactured with a bonding agent to trap many small air cells, resulting in the characteristically air-filled low-density "glass wool" family of products.

Glass fiber has roughly comparable mechanical properties to other fibers such as polymers and carbon fiber. Although not as rigid as carbon fiber, it is much cheaper and significantly less brittle when used in composites. Glass fiber reinforced composites are used in marine industry and piping industries because of good environmental resistance, better damage tolerance for impact loading, high specific strength and stiffness.

== Fiber formation ==
Glass fiber is formed when thin strands of silica-based or other formulation glass are extruded into many fibers with small diameters suitable for textile processing. The technique of heating and drawing glass into fine fibers has been known for millennia, and was practiced in Egypt and Venice. Before the recent use of these fibers for textile applications, all glass fiber had been manufactured as staple (that is, clusters of short lengths of fiber).

The modern method for producing glass wool is the invention of Games Slayter working at the Owens-Illinois Glass Company (Toledo, Ohio). He first applied for a patent for a new process to make glass wool in 1933. The first commercial production of glass fiber was in 1936. In 1938 Owens-Illinois Glass Company and Corning Glass Works joined to form the Owens-Corning Fiberglas Corporation. When the two companies joined to produce and promote glass fiber, they introduced continuous filament glass fibers. Owens-Corning is still the major glass-fiber producer in the market today.

The most common type of glass fiber used in fiberglass is E-glass, which is alumino-borosilicate glass with less than 1% w/w alkali oxides, mainly used for glass-reinforced plastics. Other types of glass used are A-glass (Alkali-lime glass with little or no boron oxide), E-CR-glass (Electrical/Chemical Resistance; alumino-lime silicate with less than 1% w/w alkali oxides, with high acid resistance), C-glass (alkali-lime glass with high boron oxide content, used for glass staple fibers and insulation), D-glass (borosilicate glass, named for its low dielectric constant), R-glass (alumino silicate glass without MgO and CaO with high mechanical requirements as reinforcement), and S-glass (alumino silicate glass without CaO but with high MgO content with high tensile strength).

Pure silica (silicon dioxide), when cooled as fused quartz into a glass with no true melting point, can be used as a glass fiber for fiberglass, but has the drawback that it must be worked at very high temperatures. In order to lower the necessary work temperature, other materials are introduced as "fluxing agents" (i.e., components to lower the melting point). Ordinary A-glass ("A" for "alkali-lime") or soda lime glass, crushed and ready to be remelted, as so-called cullet glass, was the first type of glass used for fiberglass. E-glass ("E" because of initial electrical application), is alkali-free, and was the first glass formulation used for continuous filament formation. It now makes up most of the fiberglass production in the world, and also is the single largest consumer of boron minerals globally. It is susceptible to chloride ion attack and is a poor choice for marine applications. S-glass ("S" for "Strength") is used when high tensile strength (modulus) is important, and is thus important in composites for building and aircraft construction. The same substance is known as R-glass ("R" for "reinforcement") in Europe. C-glass ("C" for "chemical resistance") and T-glass ("T" is for "thermal insulator" – a North American variant of C-glass) are resistant to chemical attack; both are often found in insulation-grades of blown fiberglass.

Common Fiber Categories and Associated Characteristic
Category	Characteristic
A, alkali	Soda lime glass/ high alkali
C, chemical	High chemical resistance
D, dielectric	Low dielectric constant
E, electrical	Low electrical conductivity
M, modulus	High tensile modulus
S, strength	High tensile strength
Special Purpose
ECR	Long term acid resistance and short term alkali resistance
R and Te	High tensile strength and properties at high temperatures

== Chemistry ==
The basis of textile-grade glass fibers is silica, SiO_{2}. In its pure form it exists as a polymer, (SiO_{2})_{n}. It has no true melting point but softens up to 1200 °C, where it starts to degrade. At 1713 °C, most of the molecules can move about freely. If the glass is extruded and cooled quickly at this temperature, it will be unable to form an ordered structure. In the polymer it forms SiO_{4} groups which are configured as a tetrahedron with the silicon atom at the center, and four oxygen atoms at the corners. These atoms then form a network bonded at the corners by sharing the oxygen atoms.

The vitreous and crystalline states of silica (glass and quartz) have similar energy levels on a molecular basis, also implying that the glassy form is extremely stable. In order to induce crystallization, it must be heated to temperatures above 1200 °C for long periods of time.

Although pure silica is a perfectly viable glass and glass fiber, it must be worked with at very high temperatures, which is a drawback unless its specific chemical properties are needed. It is usual to introduce impurities into the glass in the form of other materials to lower its working temperature. These materials also impart various other properties to the glass that may be beneficial in different applications. The first type of glass used for fiber was soda lime glass or A-glass ("A" for the alkali it contains). It is not very resistant to alkali. A newer, alkali-free (<2%) type, E-glass, is an alumino-borosilicate glass. C-glass was developed to resist attack from chemicals, mostly acids that destroy E-glass. T-glass is a North American variant of C-glass. AR-glass is alkali-resistant glass. Most glass fibers have limited solubility in water but are very dependent on pH. Chloride ions will also attack and dissolve E-glass surfaces.

E-glass does not actually melt, but softens instead, the softening point being "the temperature at which a 0.55–0.77 mm diameter fiber 235 mm long, elongates under its own weight at 1 mm/min when suspended vertically and heated at the rate of 5 °C per minute". The strain point is reached when the glass has a viscosity of 10^{14.5} poise. The annealing point, which is the temperature where the internal stresses are reduced to an acceptable commercial limit in 15 minutes, is marked by a viscosity of 10^{13} poise.

== Properties ==
=== Thermal ===
Fabrics of woven glass fibers are useful thermal insulators because of their high ratio of surface area to weight. However, the increased surface area makes them much more susceptible to chemical attack. By trapping air within them, blocks of glass fiber make good thermal insulation, with a thermal conductivity of the order of 0.05 W/(m·K).

=== Selected properties ===
Fiber type	Tensile strength	Compressive strength	Young's Modulus, E	Density	Coefficient of thermal expansion (μm/m·°C)	Softening point
E-glass	3,445 MPa (499.7 ksi)	1,080 MPa (157 ksi)	76.0 GPa (11,020 ksi)	2.58 g/cm^{3} (0.093 lb/cu in)	5.4	846 °C (1,555 °F)
C-glass	3,300 MPa (480 ksi)	--	69.0 GPa (10,010 ksi)	2.49 g/cm^{3} (0.090 lb/cu in)	7.2	--
S-2 glass	4,890 MPa (709 ksi)	1,600 MPa (230 ksi)	85.5 GPa (12,400 ksi)	2.46 g/cm^{3} (0.089 lb/cu in)	2.9	1,056 °C (1,933 °F)

=== Mechanical properties ===
The strength of glass is usually tested and reported for "virgin" or pristine fibers—those that have just been manufactured. The freshest, thinnest fibers are the strongest because the thinner fibers are more ductile. The more the surface is scratched, the less the resulting tenacity. Because glass has an amorphous structure, its properties are the same along the fiber and across the fiber. Humidity is an important factor in the tensile strength. Moisture is easily adsorbed and can worsen microscopic cracks and surface defects, and lessen tenacity.

In contrast to carbon fiber, glass can undergo more elongation before it breaks. Thinner filaments can bend further before they break. The viscosity of the molten glass is very important for manufacturing success. During drawing, the process where the hot glass is pulled to reduce the diameter of the fiber, the viscosity must be relatively low. If it is too high, the fiber will break during drawing. However, if it is too low, the glass will form droplets instead of being drawn out into a fiber.

== Manufacturing processes ==
=== Melting ===
There are two main types of glass fiber manufacture and two main types of glass fiber product. First, fiber is made either from a direct melt process or a marble remelt process. Both start with the raw materials in solid form. The materials are mixed together and melted in a furnace. Then, for the marble process, the molten material is sheared and rolled into marbles which are cooled and packaged. The marbles are taken to the fiber manufacturing facility where they are inserted into a can and remelted. The molten glass is extruded to the bushing to be formed into fiber. In the direct melt process, the molten glass in the furnace goes directly to the bushing for formation.

=== Formation ===
The bushing plate is the most important part of the machinery for making the fiber. This is a small metal furnace containing nozzles for the fiber to be formed through. It is almost always made of platinum alloyed with rhodium for durability. Platinum is used because the glass melt has a natural affinity for wetting it. When bushings were first used they were pure platinum, and the glass wetted the bushing so easily that it ran under the plate after exiting the nozzle and accumulated on the underside. Also, due to its cost and the tendency to wear, the platinum was alloyed with rhodium. In the direct melt process, the bushing serves as a collector for the molten glass. It is heated slightly to keep the glass at the correct temperature for fiber formation. In the marble melt process, the bushing acts more like a furnace as it melts more of the material.

Bushings are the major expense in fiber glass production. The nozzle design is also critical. The number of nozzles ranges from 200 to 4000 in multiples of 200. The important part of the nozzle in continuous filament manufacture is the thickness of its walls in the exit region. It was found that inserting a counterbore here reduced wetting. Today, the nozzles are designed to have a minimum thickness at the exit. As glass flows through the nozzle, it forms a drop which is suspended from the end. As it falls, it leaves a thread attached by the meniscus to the nozzle as long as the viscosity is in the correct range for fiber formation. The smaller the annular ring of the nozzle and the thinner the wall at exit, the faster the drop will form and fall away, and the lower its tendency to wet the vertical part of the nozzle. The surface tension of the glass is what influences the formation of the meniscus. For E-glass it should be around 400 mN/m.

The attenuation (drawing) speed is important in the nozzle design. Although slowing this speed down can make coarser fiber, it is uneconomic to run at speeds for which the nozzles were not designed.

=== Continuous filament process ===
In the continuous filament process, after the fiber is drawn, a size is applied. This size helps protect the fiber as it is wound onto a bobbin. The particular size applied relates to end-use. While some sizes are processing aids, others make the fiber have an affinity for a certain resin, if the fiber is to be used in a composite. Size is usually added at 0.5–2.0% by weight. Winding then takes place at around 1 km/min.

=== Staple fiber process ===
For staple fiber production, there are a number of ways to manufacture the fiber. The glass can be blown or blasted with heat or steam after exiting the formation machine. Usually these fibers are made into some sort of mat. The most common process used is the rotary process. Here, the glass enters a rotating spinner, and due to centrifugal force is thrown out horizontally. The air jets push it down vertically, and binder is applied. Then the mat is vacuumed to a screen and the binder is cured in the oven.

== Safety ==
Glass fiber has increased in popularity since the discovery that asbestos causes cancer and its subsequent removal from most products. Following this increase in popularity, the safety of glass fiber has also been called into question. Research shows that the composition of glass fiber can cause similar toxicity as asbestos since both are silicate fibers.

Studies on rats conducted during the 1970s found that fibrous glass of less than 3 μm in diameter and greater than 20 μm in length is a "potent carcinogen". Likewise, the International Agency for Research on Cancer found it "may reasonably be anticipated to be a carcinogen" in 1990. However fiberglass is usually manufactured with greater diameters than 3 μm. The American Conference of Governmental Industrial Hygienists, on the other hand, says that there is insufficient evidence, and that glass fiber is in group A4: "Not classifiable as a human carcinogen".

The North American Insulation Manufacturers Association (NAIMA) claims that glass fiber is fundamentally different from asbestos, since it is man-made instead of naturally occurring. They claim that glass fiber "dissolves in the lungs", while asbestos remains in the body for life. Although both glass fiber and asbestos are made from silica filaments, NAIMA claims that asbestos is more dangerous because of its crystalline structure, which causes it to cleave into smaller, more dangerous pieces, citing the U.S. Department of Health and Human Services:

Synthetic vitreous fibers [fiber glass] differ from asbestos in two ways that may provide at least partial explanations for their lower toxicity. Because most synthetic vitreous fibers are not crystalline like asbestos, they do not split longitudinally to form thinner fibers. They also generally have markedly less biopersistence in biological tissues than asbestos fibers because they can undergo dissolution and transverse breakage.

A 1998 study using rats found that the biopersistence of synthetic fibers after one year was 0.04–13%, but 27% for amosite asbestos. Fibers that persisted longer were found to be more carcinogenic.

== Glass-reinforced plastic (fiberglass) ==
Glass-reinforced plastic (GRP) is a composite material or fiber-reinforced plastic made of a plastic reinforced by fine glass fibers. The glass can be in the form of a chopped strand mat (CSM) or a woven fabric.

As with many other composite materials (such as reinforced concrete), the two materials act together, each overcoming the deficits of the other. Whereas the plastic resins are strong in compressive loading and relatively weak in tensile strength, the glass fibers are very strong in tension but tend not to resist compression. By combining the two materials, GRP becomes a material that resists both compressive and tensile forces well. The two materials may be used uniformly or the glass may be specifically placed in those portions of the structure that will experience tensile loads.

== Uses ==
Uses for regular glass fiber include mats and fabrics for thermal insulation, electrical insulation, sound insulation, high-strength fabrics or heat- and corrosion-resistant fabrics. It is also used to reinforce various materials, such as tent poles, pole vault poles, arrows, bows and crossbows, translucent roofing panels, automobile bodies, hockey sticks, surfboards, boat hulls, and paper honeycomb. It has been used for medical purposes in casts. Glass fiber is extensively used for making FRP tanks and vessels.

Open-weave glass fiber grids are used to reinforce asphalt pavement. Non-woven glass fiber/polymer blend mats are used saturated with asphalt emulsion and overlaid with asphalt, producing a waterproof, crack-resistant membrane. Use of glass-fiber reinforced polymer rebar instead of steel rebar shows promise in areas where avoidance of steel corrosion is desired.

=== Potential uses ===
Glass fiber has recently seen use in biomedical applications in the assistance of joint replacement where the electric field orientation of short phosphate glass fibers can improve osteogenic qualities through the proliferation of osteoblasts and with improved surface chemistry. Another potential use is within electronic applications as sodium based glass fibers assist or replace lithium in lithium-ion batteries due to its improved electronic properties.

== Role of recycling in glass fiber manufacturing ==
Manufacturers of glass-fiber insulation can use recycled glass. Recycled glass fiber contains up to 40% recycled glass.

== See also ==
- Basalt fiber
- Carbon fiber
- BS4994
- Composite materials
- Fiberglass
- Fiberglass molding
- Filament tape
- Gelcoat
- Glass cloth
- Glass fiber reinforced concrete (GFRC or GRC)
- Glass microsphere
- Glass Poling
- Glass wool
- Optical fiber
- Pele's hair, naturally occurring glass fibre.
- Quartz fiber
