= Glass poling =

Glass poling is the physical process through which the distribution of the electrical charges is changed. In principle, the charges are randomly distributed and no permanent electric field exists inside the glass.

When the charges are moved and fixed at a place then a permanent field will be recorded in the glass. This electric field will permit various optical functions in the glass, impossible otherwise. The resulting effect would be like having positive and negative poles as in a battery, but inside an optical fibre.

The effect will be a change of the optical fibre properties. For instance glass poling will permit to realize second-harmonic light generation which consists of converting an input light into another wavelength, twice the original radiation frequency and half of the wave length. For instance a near infrared radiation around 1030 nm could be converted with this process to the 515 nm wavelength, corresponding to green light.

Glass poling also allows for the creation of the linear electro-optic effect that can be used for other functions like light modulation.

So, glass poling relies on recording an electric field which breaks the original symmetry of the material. Poling of glass is done by applying high voltage to the medium, while exciting it with heat, ultraviolet light or some other source of energy. Heat will permit the charges to move by diffusion and the high voltage permits to give a direction to the charges displacement.

Optical poling of silica fibers allows for second-harmonic generation through the creation of a self-organized periodic distribution of charges at the core-cladding interface.

UV poling received much attention because of the high non-linearity reported, but interest dwindled when various groups failed to reproduce the results.

== Thermal poling ==
Strong electric fields are created by thermal poling of silica, subjecting the glass simultaneously to temperatures in the range of 280 °C and a few kilovolts bias for several minutes. Cations are mobile at elevated temperature (e.g., Na+) and are displaced by the poling field from the anode side of the sample. This creates a region a few micrometers thick of high electrical resistivity depleted of positive ions near the anodic surface. The depleted region is negatively charged, and if the sample is cooled to room temperature when the poling voltage is on, the distribution of electrons becomes frozen. After poling, positive charge attracted to the anodic surface and negative charge inside the glass create a recorded field that can reach 10^{9} V/m. More detailed studies, show that there is little or no accumulation of cations near the cathode electrode, and that the layer nearest to the anode suffers partial neutralization if poling persists for an excessively long time. The process of glass poling is very similar to the one used for Anodic bonding, where the recorded electric field bonds the glass sample to the anode.

In thermal poling, one exploits effects of nonlinear optics created by the strong recorded field. An effective second-order optical non-linearity arises from χ^{(2)}_{eff} ~ 3 χ^{(3)} E_{rec}. In silica glass, the non-linear coefficient induced is ~1 pm/V, while in fibers it is a fraction of this value. The use of fibers with internal electrodes makes it possible to pole the fibers to make them exhibit the linear electro-optic effect and then control the refractive index with the application of voltage, for switching and modulation. The recorded field in a poled fiber can be erased by exposing the poled fiber from the side to UV radiation.

This makes it possible to artificially create an electric-field grating with arbitrary period, which satisfies the condition necessary for quasi-phase-matching. Periodic poling is used for efficient frequency-doubling in optical fibers.
