= Optical parametric amplifier =

Laser light source

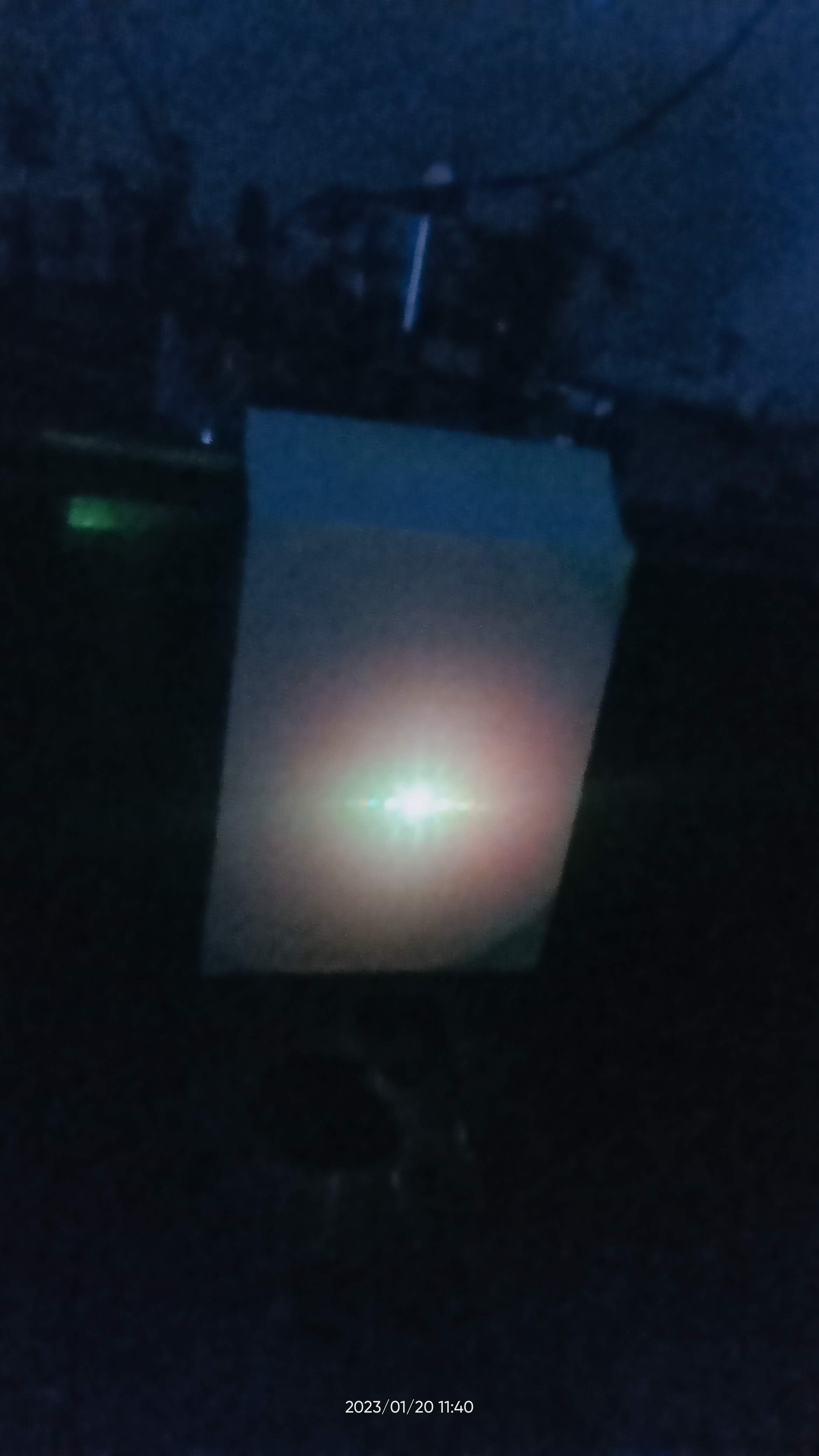
Typical view of beam output from the optical parametric amplifiers which contains a broadband of frequencies with one selected frequency standing-out from the others.

An optical parametric amplifier, abbreviated OPA, is a laser light source that emits light of variable wavelengths by an optical parametric amplification process. It is essentially the same as an optical parametric oscillator, but without the optical cavity (i.e., the light beams pass through the apparatus just once or twice, rather than many many times).

== Optical parametric generation (OPG) ==
Optical parametric generation (OPG) (also called "optical parametric fluorescence", or "spontaneous parametric down conversion") often precedes optical parametric amplification.

In optical parametric generation, the input is one light beam of frequency ω_{p}, and the output is two light beams of lower frequencies ω_{s} and ω_{i}, with the requirement ω_{p}=ω_{s}+ω_{i}. These two lower-frequency beams are called the "signal" and "idler", respectively.

This light emission is based on the nonlinear optical principle. The photon of an incident laser pulse (pump) is, by a nonlinear optical crystal, divided into two lower-energy photons. The wavelengths of the signal and the idler are determined by the phase matching condition, which is changed, e.g. by temperature or, in bulk optics, by the angle between the incident pump laser ray and the optical axes of the crystal. The wavelengths of the signal and the idler photons can, therefore, be tuned by changing the phase matching condition.

== Optical parametric amplification (OPA) ==
Photon picture of optical parametric amplification: A pump photon excites a virtual energy level whose decay is stimulated by a signal photon resulting in the emission of an identical second signal photon and an idler photon under conversion of energy and momentum.

The output beams in optical parametric generation are usually relatively weak and have relatively spread-out direction and frequency. This problem is solved by using optical parametric amplification (OPA), also called difference frequency generation, as a second stage after the OPG.

In an OPA, the input is two light beams, of frequency ω_{p} and ω_{s}. The OPA will make the pump beam (ω_{p}) weaker, and amplify the signal beam (ω_{s}), and also create a new, so-called idler beam at the frequency ω_{i} with ω_{p}=ω_{s}+ω_{i}.

In the OPA, the pump and idler photons usually travel collinearly through a nonlinear optical crystal. Phase matching is required for the process to work well.

Because the wavelengths of an OPG+OPA system can be varied (unlike most lasers which have a fixed wavelength), they are used in many spectroscopic methods.

As an example of OPA, the incident pump pulse is the 800 nm (12500 cm^{−1}) output of a Ti:sapphire laser, and the two outputs, signal and idler, are in the near-infrared region, the sum of the wavenumber of which is equal to 12500 cm^{−1}.

== Noncollinear OPA (NOPA) ==
Because most nonlinear crystals are birefringent, beams that are collinear inside a crystal may not be collinear outside of it. The phase fronts (wave vector) do not point in the same direction as the energy flow (Poynting vector) because of walk-off.

The phase matching angle makes possible any gain at all (0th order). In a collinear setup, the freedom to choose the center wavelength allows a constant gain up to first order in wavelength. Noncollinear OPAs were developed to have an additional degree of freedom, allowing constant gain up to second order in wavelength. The optimal parameters are 4 degrees of noncollinearity, β-barium borate (BBO) as the material, a 400-nm pump wavelength, and signal around 800 nm (and can be tunable in the range 605-750 nm with sub-10 fs pulse width which allows exploring the ultrafast dynamics of large molecules) This generates a bandwidth 3 times as large of that of a Ti-sapphire-amplifier. The first order is mathematically equivalent to some properties of the group velocities involved, but this does not mean that pump and signal have the same group velocity. After propagation through 1-mm BBO, a short pump pulse no longer overlaps with the signal. Therefore, chirped pulse amplification must be used in situations requiring large gain amplification in long crystals. Long crystals introduce such a large chirp that a compressor is needed anyway. An extreme chirp can lengthen a 20-fs seed pulse to 50 ps, making it suitable for use as the pump. Unchirped 50-ps pulses with high energy can be generated from rare earth-based lasers.

The optical parametric amplifier has a wider bandwidth than a -amplifier, which in turn has a wider bandwidth than an optical parametric oscillator because of white-light generation even one octave wide (for example using nonlinear self-phase modulation in neon gas). Therefore, a subband can be selected and fairly short pulses can still be generated.

The higher gain per mm for BBO compared to Ti:Sa and, more importantly, lower amplified spontaneous emission allows for higher overall gain. Interlacing compressors and OPA leads to tilted pulses.

== Multipass OPA ==
Multipass can be used for walk off and group velocity (dispersion) compensation; constant intensity with increasing signal power means to have an exponential rising cross section. This can be done by means of lenses, which also refocus the beams to have the beam waist in the crystal; reduction of OPG by increasing the pump power proportional to the signal and splitting the pump across the passes of the signal; broadband amplification by dumping the idler and optionally individually detuning the crystals; complete pump depletion by offsetting the pump and signal in time and space at every pass and feeding one pump pulse through all passes; high gain with BBO, since BBO is only available in small dimensions. Since the direction of the beams is fixed, multiple passes cannot be overlapped into a single small crystal like in a Ti:Sa amplifier. Unless one uses noncolinear geometry and adjusts amplified beams onto the parametric fluorescence cone produced by the pump pulse.

== Relationship to parametric amplifiers in electronics ==
The idea of parametric amplification first arose at much lower frequencies: AC circuits, including radio frequency and microwave frequency (in the earliest investigations, sound waves were also studied). In these applications, typically a strong pump signal (or "local oscillator") at frequency f passes through a circuit element whose parameters are modulated by the weak "signal" wave at frequency f_{s} (for example, the signal might modulate the capacitance of a varactor diode). The result is that some of the energy of the local oscillator gets transferred to the signal frequency f_{s}, as well as the difference ("idler") frequency f-f_{s}. The term parametric amplifier is used because the parameters of the circuit are varied.

The optical case uses the same basic principle—transferring energy from a wave at the pump frequency to waves at the signal and idler frequencies—so it took the same name.

== See also ==
- Optical parametric oscillator
- SU(1,1) interferometry

== Footnotes and references ==
- Boichenko, V.L.; Zasavitskii, I.I.; Kosichkin, Yu.V.; Tarasevich, A.P.; Tunkin, V.G.; Shotov, A.P. (1984) "A picosecond optical parametric oscillator with amplification of the tunable semiconductor laser radiation", Soviet Journal of Quantum Electronics 11 (1): 141–143.
- Magnitskii, S.A.; Malakhova, V.I.; Tarasevich, A.P.; Tunkin, V.G.; Yakubovich, S.D. (1986) "Generation of bandwidth-limited tunable picosecond pulses by injection-locked optical parametric oscillator", Optics Letters 11 (1): 18–20.
