= Lithium niobate =

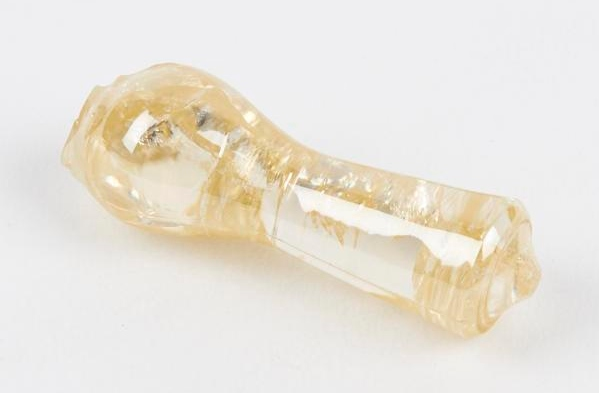

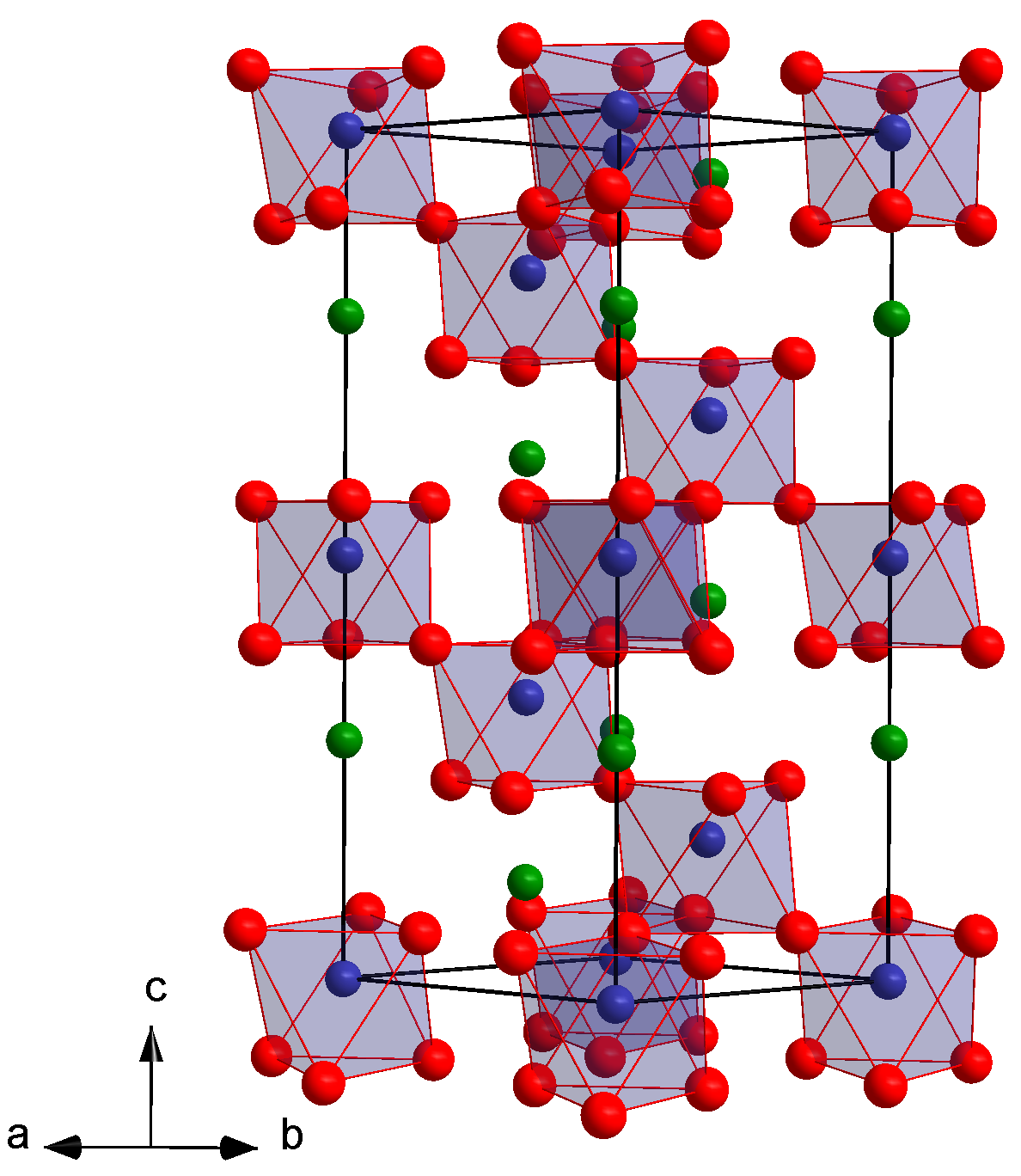
- __ Li^{+} __ Nb^{5+} __ O^{2−}

Names
- Other names Lithium niobium oxide, lithium niobium trioxide

Identifiers
CAS Number	12031-63-9
3D model (JSmol)	Interactive image
ChemSpider	10605804
ECHA InfoCard	100.031.583
PubChem CID	159404
CompTox Dashboard (EPA)	DTXSID00894183
- InChI: InChI=1S/Li.Nb.3O/q+1;;;;-1 Key: GQYHUHYESMUTHG-UHFFFAOYSA-N; InChI=1/Li.Nb.3O/q+1;;;;-1/rLi.NbO3/c;2-1(3)4/q+1;-1 Key: GQYHUHYESMUTHG-YHKBGIKBAK
- SMILES: [Li+].[O-][Nb](=O)=O

Properties
Chemical formula	LiNbO_{3}
Molar mass	147.846 g/mol
Appearance	colorless solid
Density	4.30 g/cm^{3}
Melting point	1,240 °C (2,260 °F; 1,510 K)
Solubility in water	None
Band gap	3.77 eV
Refractive index (n_{D})	n_{o} 2.3007, n_{e} 2.2116

Structure
Crystal structure	Trigonal, hR30
Space group	R3c, No. 161
Point group	3m (C_{3v})
Lattice constant	a = 0.51501 nm, b = 0.51501 nm, c = 0.54952 nm α = 62.057°, β = 62.057°, γ = 60°
Formula units (Z)	6

Hazards
- Lethal dose or concentration (LD, LC)
LD_{50} (median dose)	8 g/kg (oral, rat)
- Except where otherwise noted, data are given for materials in their standard state (at 25 °C [77 °F], 100 kPa). verify (what is ?) Infobox references

Lithium niobate (LiNbO_{3}) is a synthetic salt consisting of niobium, lithium, and oxygen. Its single crystals are an important material for optical waveguides, mobile phones, piezoelectric sensors, optical modulators and various other linear and non-linear optical applications. Lithium niobate is sometimes referred to by the brand name linobate.

== Properties ==
Lithium niobate is a colorless solid, and it is insoluble in water. It has a trigonal crystal system, which lacks inversion symmetry and displays ferroelectricity, the Pockels effect, the piezoelectric effect, photoelasticity and nonlinear optical polarizability. Lithium niobate has negative uniaxial birefringence which depends slightly on the stoichiometry of the crystal and on temperature. It is transparent for wavelengths between 350 and 5200 nanometers.

Lithium niobate can be doped with magnesium oxide, which increases its resistance to optical damage (also known as photorefractive damage). Other available dopants are iron, zinc, hafnium, copper, gadolinium, erbium, yttrium, manganese and boron.

== Growth ==
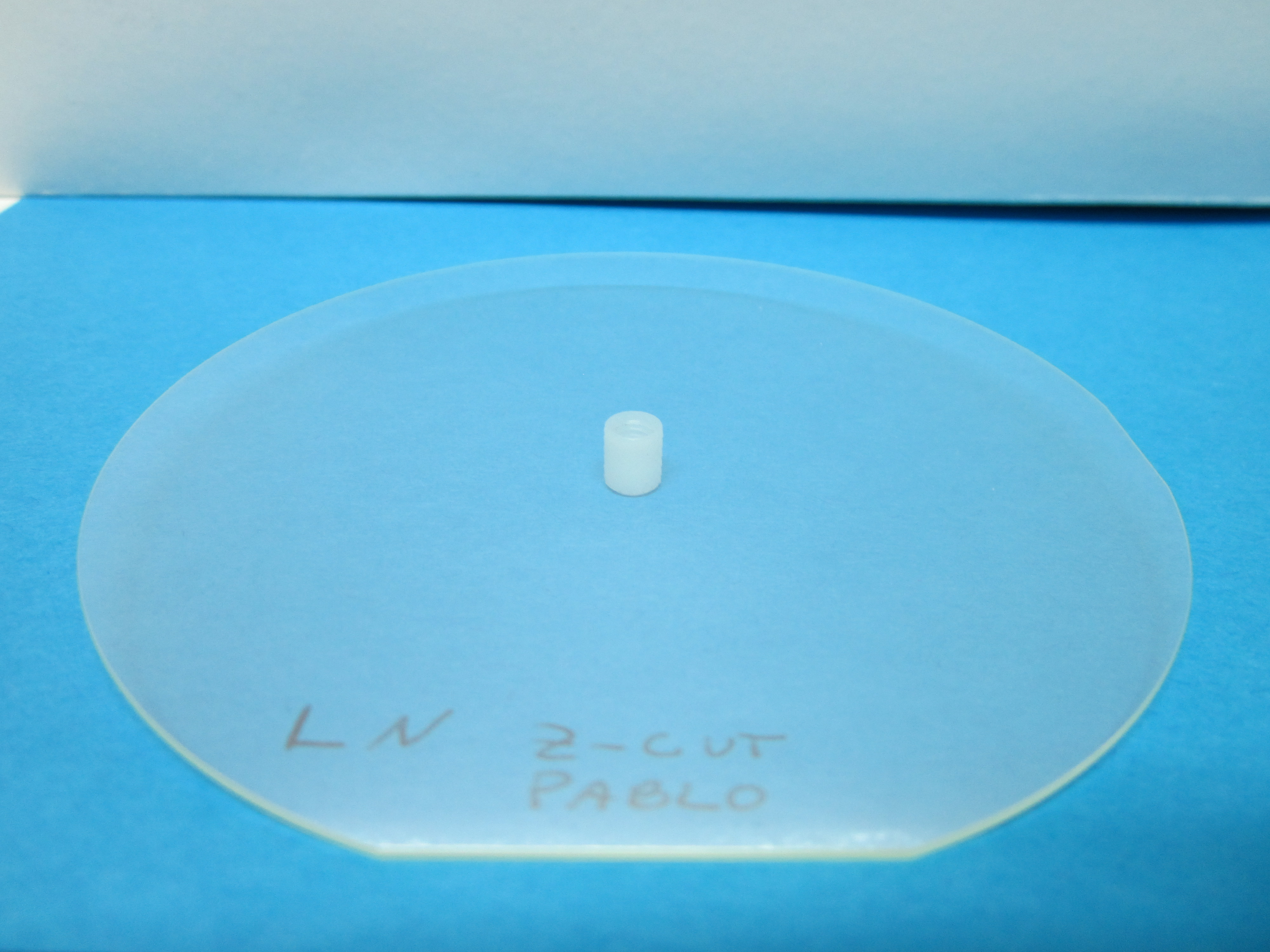
A Z-cut, single-crystal lithium-niobate wafer

Single crystals of lithium niobate can be grown using the Czochralski process.

After a crystal is grown, it is sliced into wafers of different orientation. Common orientations are Z-cut, X-cut, Y-cut, and cuts with rotated angles of the previous axes.

=== Thin films ===
Thin film lithium niobate (e.g. for optical waveguides) can be transferred to or grown on sapphire and other substrates, using the smart cut (ion slicing) process or MOCVD process. The technology is known as lithium niobate on insulator (LNOI).

== Nanoparticles ==
Nanoparticles of lithium niobate and niobium pentoxide can be produced at low temperature. The complete protocol implies a LiH induced reduction of NbCl_{5} followed by in situ spontaneous oxidation into low-valence niobium nano-oxides. These niobium oxides are exposed to air atmosphere resulting in pure Nb_{2}O_{5}. Finally, the stable Nb_{2}O_{5} is converted into lithium niobate LiNbO_{3} nanoparticles during the controlled hydrolysis of the LiH excess. Spherical nanoparticles of lithium niobate with a diameter of approximately 10 nm can be prepared by impregnating a mesoporous silica matrix with a mixture of an aqueous solution of LiNO_{3} and NH_{4}NbO(C_{2}O_{4})_{2} followed by 10 min heating in an infrared furnace.

== Applications ==
Lithium niobate is used extensively in the telecommunications market, e.g. in mobile telephones and optical modulators. Due to its large electro-mechanical coupling, it is the material of choice for surface acoustic wave (SAW) devices. For some uses it can be replaced by lithium tantalate (LiTaO_{3}). Other uses are in laser frequency doubling, nonlinear optics, Pockels cells, optical parametric oscillators, Q-switching devices for lasers, other acousto-optic devices, optical switches for gigahertz frequencies, etc. It is an excellent material for manufacture of optical waveguides. It's also used in the making of optical spatial low-pass (anti-aliasing) filters. Additionally, it is used in pyroelectric infrared (IR) detectors, where it detects temperature changes by generating electric charges.

In the past few years lithium niobate is finding applications as a kind of electrostatic tweezers, an approach known as optoelectronic tweezers as the effect requires light excitation to take place. This effect allows for fine manipulation of micrometer-scale particles with high flexibility since the tweezing action is constrained to the illuminated area. The effect is based on the very high electric fields generated during light exposure (1–100 kV/cm) within the illuminated spot. These intense fields are also finding applications in biophysics and biotechnology, as they can influence living organisms in a variety of ways. For example, iron-doped lithium niobate excited with visible light has been shown to produce cell death in tumoral cell cultures.

== Periodically poled lithium niobate ==
Periodically poled lithium niobate (PPLN) is a domain-engineered lithium niobate crystal, used mainly for achieving quasi-phase-matching in nonlinear optics. The ferroelectric domains point alternatively to the +c and the −c direction, with a period of typically between 5 and 35 μm. The shorter periods of this range are used for second-harmonic generation, while the longer ones for optical parametric oscillation. Periodic poling can be achieved by electrical poling with a periodically structured electrode. Controlled heating of the crystal can be used to fine-tune phase matching in the medium due to a slight variation of the dispersion with temperature.

Periodic poling uses the largest value of lithium niobate's nonlinear tensor, d_{33} = 27 pm/V. Quasi-phase-matching gives maximum efficiencies that are 2/π (64%) of the full d_{33}, about 17 pm/V.

Other materials used for periodic poling are wide-band-gap inorganic crystals like KTP (resulting in periodically poled KTP, PPKTP), lithium tantalate, and some organic materials.

The periodic-poling technique can also be used to form surface nanostructures.

Due to its low photorefractive damage threshold, PPLN only finds limited applications at very low power levels. Periodically poled MgO-doped lithium niobate (PPMgOLN) expands the applications to a medium power level.

=== Sellmeier equations ===
The Sellmeier equations for the extraordinary index are used to find the poling period and approximate temperature for quasi-phase-matching. Jundt gives

$$n^2_e \approx 5.35583 + 4.629 \times 10^{-7} f
+ \frac{0.100473 + 3.862 \times 10^{-8} f}{\lambda^2 - (0.20692 - 0.89 \times 10^{-8} f)^2}
+ \frac{100 + 2.657 \times 10^{-5} f}{\lambda^2 - 11.34927^2}
- 1.5334 \times 10^{-2} \lambda^2,$$

valid from 20 to 250 °C for wavelengths from 0.4 to 5 micrometers, whereas for longer wavelengths,

$$n^2_e \approx 5.39121 + 4.968 \times 10^{-7} f
+ \frac{0.100473 + 3.862 \times 10^{-8} f}{\lambda^2 - (0.20692 - 0.89 \times 10^{-8} f)^2}
+ \frac{100 + 2.657 \times 10^{-5} f}{\lambda^2 - 11.34927^2}
- (1.544 \times 10^{-2} + 9.62119 \times 10^{-10} \lambda) \lambda^2,$$

which is valid for T = 25 to 180 °C, for wavelengths λ between 2.8 and 4.8 micrometers.

In these equations f = (T − 24.5)(T + 570.82), λ is in micrometers, and T is in °C.

More generally for ordinary and extraordinary index for MgO-doped LiNbO_{3}:

$${
n^2 \approx a_1 + b_1 f
+ \frac{a_2 + b_2 f}{\lambda^2 - (a_3 + b_3 f)^2}
+ \frac{a_4 + b_4 f}{\lambda^2 - a_5^2}
- a_6 \lambda^2,
}$$

with:

Parameters	5% MgO-doped CLN		1% MgO-doped SLN
Parameters	n_{e}	n_{o}	n_{e}
a_{1}	5.756	5.653	5.078
a_{2}	0.0983	0.1185	0.0964
a_{3}	0.2020	0.2091	0.2065
a_{4}	189.32	89.61	61.16
a_{5}	12.52	10.85	10.55
a_{6}	1.32×10^{−2}	1.97×10^{−2}	1.59×10^{−2}
b_{1}	2.860×10^{−6}	7.941×10^{−7}	4.677×10^{−7}
b_{2}	4.700×10^{−8}	3.134×10^{−8}	7.822×10^{−8}
b_{3}	6.113×10^{−8}	−4.641×10^{−9}	−2.653×10^{−8}
b_{4}	1.516×10^{−4}	−2.188×10^{−6}	1.096×10^{−4}

for congruent LiNbO_{3} (CLN) and stochiometric LiNbO_{3} (SLN).

== Cited sources ==
- Haynes, William M., ed. (2016). CRC Handbook of Chemistry and Physics (97th ed.). CRC Press. ISBN 978-1-4987-5429-3.
