= Half-harmonic generation =

Nonlinear optical process

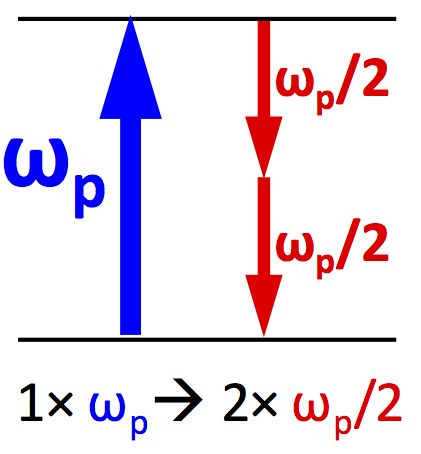
Energy level scheme of half-harmonic generation process

Half-harmonic generation (also called wavelength doubling or frequency halving) is a nonlinear optical process in which photons "split" to generate pairs of new photons with half the energy, therefore half the frequency and twice the wavelength of the initial photons. The half-harmonic generation process is the inverse of second-harmonic generation and can occur in optical parametric oscillators at degeneracy, and is a phase- and frequency-locked down-conversion process.

In the continuous-wave regime, stable half-harmonic generation in an optical parametric oscillator was experimentally demonstrated in 1990, and in the femtosecond regime, it was experimentally demonstrated in 2012. Half-harmonic generation is used as a phase- and frequency-locked down-conversion process for generation of mid-infrared frequency combs using near-infrared frequency combs, and a conversion efficiency of ~64% is experimentally demonstrated.

Half-harmonic generation can also lead to generation of different quantum states of light, for instance, below the oscillation threshold it can lead to generation of squeezed vacuum, and around threshold it can potentially generate cat states.
