= Lithium tantalate =

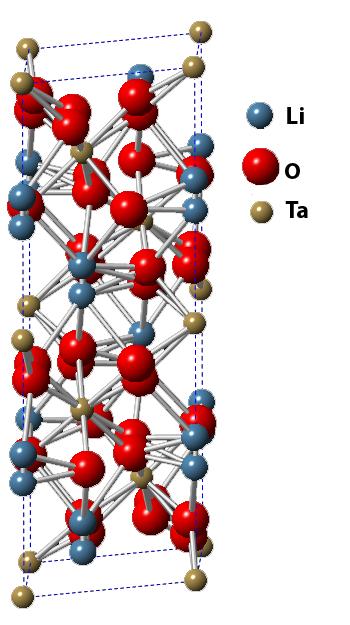

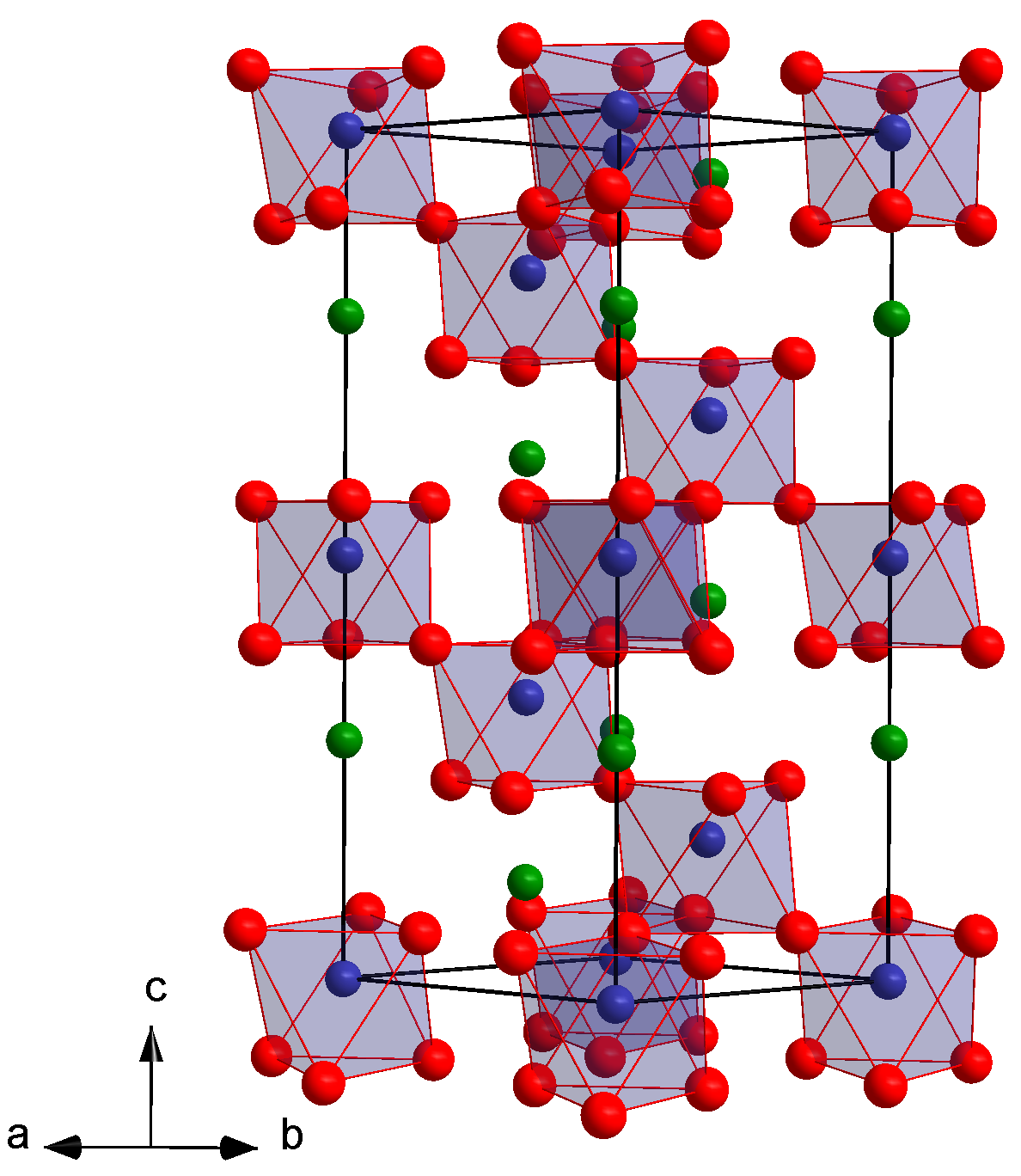
- __ Li^{+} __ Ta^{5+} __ O^{2−}

Names
- IUPAC name Lithium tantalate
- Other names Lithium metatantalate

Identifiers
CAS Number	12031-66-2
3D model (JSmol)	Interactive image
ChemSpider	11555951
ECHA InfoCard	100.031.584
EC Number	234-757-5
PubChem CID	159405
RTECS number	WW55470000
CompTox Dashboard (EPA)	DTXSID60923322
- InChI: InChI=1S/Li.3O.Ta/q+1;3*-2;+5 Key: JNQQEOHHHGGZCY-UHFFFAOYSA-N
- SMILES: [Li+].[O-2].[O-2].[O-2].[Ta+5]

Properties
Chemical formula	LiO_{3}Ta
Molar mass	235.88 g·mol^{−1}
Density	7.46 g/cm^{3}, solid
Melting point	1,650 °C (3,000 °F; 1,920 K)
Solubility in water	Insoluble in water

Structure
Crystal structure	Space group R3c
Lattice constant	a = 515.43 pm, c = 1378.35 pm

Hazards
- Occupational safety and health (OHS/OSH)
Main hazards	Acute Toxicity: Oral, Inhalation, Dermal
- Safety data sheet (SDS)

Related compounds
Other anions	LiNbO_{3}

Supplementary data page
- Lithium tantalate (data page)
- Except where otherwise noted, data are given for materials in their standard state (at 25 °C [77 °F], 100 kPa). verify (what is ?) Infobox references

Lithium tantalate is the inorganic compound with the formula LiTaO_{3}. It is a white, diamagnetic, water-insoluble solid. The compound has the perovskite structure. It has optical, piezoelectric, and pyroelectric properties. Considerable information is available from commercial sources about this material.

== Synthesis and processing ==
Lithium tantalate is produced by treating tantalum(V) oxide with lithium oxide. The use of excess alkali gives water-soluble polyoxotantalates. Single crystals of Lithium tantalate are pulled from the melt using the Czochralski method.

== Applications ==
Lithium tantalate is used for nonlinear optics, passive infrared sensors such as motion detectors, terahertz generation and detection, surface acoustic wave applications, cell phones. Lithium tantalate is a standard detector element in infrared spectrophotometers.

== Research ==
The phenomenon of pyroelectric fusion has been demonstrated using a lithium tantalate crystal producing a large enough charge to generate and accelerate a beam of deuterium nuclei into a deuterated target resulting in the production of a small flux of helium-3 and neutrons through nuclear fusion without extreme heat or pressure.

A difference between positively and negatively charged parts of pyroelectric LiTaO_{3} crystals was observed when water freezes to them.

== See also ==
- Lithium tantalate (data page)
