= Quasi-phase-matching =

Technique in nonlinear optics

Quasi-phase-matching is a technique in nonlinear optics which allows a positive net flow of energy from the pump frequency to the signal and idler frequencies by creating a periodic structure in the nonlinear medium. Momentum is conserved, as is necessary for phase-matching, through an additional momentum contribution corresponding to the wavevector of the periodic structure. Consequently, in principle any three-wave mixing process that satisfies energy conservation can be phase-matched. For example, all the optical frequencies involved can be collinear, can have the same polarization, and travel through the medium in arbitrary directions. This allows one to use the largest nonlinear coefficient of the material in the nonlinear interaction.

Quasi-phase-matching ensures that there is positive energy flow from the pump frequency to signal and idler frequencies even though all the frequencies involved are not phase locked with each other. Energy will always flow from pump to signal as long as the phase between the two optical waves is less than 180 degrees. Beyond 180 degrees, energy flows back from the signal to the pump frequencies. The coherence length is the length of the medium in which the phase of pump and the sum of idler and signal frequencies are 180 degrees from each other. At each coherence length the crystal axes are flipped which allows the energy to continue to positively flow from the pump to the signal and idler frequencies.

The most commonly used technique for creating quasi-phase-matched crystals has been periodic poling. A popular material choice for this is lithium niobate. More recently, continuous phase control over the local nonlinearity was achieved using nonlinear metasurfaces with homogeneous linear optical properties but spatially varying effective nonlinear polarizability. Optical fields are strongly confined within or surround the nanostructures, nonlinear interactions can therefore be realized with an ultra-small area down to 10 nm to 100 nm and can be scattered in all directions to produce more frequencies. Thus, relaxed phase matching can be achieved at the nanoscale dimension.

== Mathematical description ==
In nonlinear optics, the generation of new frequencies is the result of the nonlinear polarization response of the crystal due to a typically monochromatic high-intensity pump frequency. When the crystal axis is flipped, the polarization wave is shifted by 180°, thus ensuring that there is a positive energy flow to the signal and idler beam. In the case of sum-frequency generation, where waves at frequencies $\omega_1$ and $\omega_2$ are mixed to produce $\omega_3=\omega_1+\omega_2$, the polarization equation can be expressed by

$$P_3 = 4 d A_1 A_2 e^{i(k_1+k_2)z},$$

where $d$ is the nonlinear susceptibility coefficient, $i$ represents the imaginary unit, $A$ are the complex-valued amplitudes, and $k=\omega/c$ is the wavenumber. In this frequency domain vector representation, the sign of the $d$ coefficient is flipped when the nonlinear (anisotropic) crystal axis is flipped,

$$P_3 = -4d A_1 A_2 e^{i(k_1+k_2)z} = 4d A_1 A_2 e^{i((k_1+k_2)z} e^{i\pi}.$$

== Development of signal amplitude ==
Let us compute the nonlinearly-generated signal amplitude in the case of second harmonic generation, where a strong pump at $\omega_1$ produces a frequency-doubled signal at $\omega_2=2\omega_1$, assuming a constant pump amplitude (undepleted pump approximation).

The signal wavelength can be expressed as a sum over the number of domains that exist in the crystal. In general the spatial rate of change of the signal amplitude is

$\frac{\partial A_2}{\partial z}=A_1^2 \chi e^{i \Delta k z},$

where $A_2$ is the generated frequency amplitude and $A_1$ is the pump frequency amplitude and $\Delta k$ is the phase mismatch between the two optical waves. The $\chi$ refers to the nonlinear susceptibility of the crystal.

In the case of a periodically poled crystal the crystal axis is flipped by 180 degrees in every other domain, which changes the sign of $\chi$. For the $n^{th}$ domain $\chi$ can be expressed as

$\chi=\chi_0 (-1)^n$

where $n$ is the index of the poled domain. The total signal amplitude $A_2$ can be expressed as a sum

$A_2=A_1^2 \chi_0 \sum^{N-1}_{n=0} (-1)^n \int^{\Lambda (n+1)}_{\Lambda n} e^{i \Delta k z} \partial z$

where $\Lambda$ is the spacing between poles in the crystal. The above equation integrates to

$A_2=-\frac{i A_1^2 \chi_0}{\Delta k} \sum^{N-1}_{n=0} (-1)^n (e^{i \Delta k \Lambda (n+1)}-e^{i \Delta k \Lambda n})$

and reduces to

$A_2=-i A_1^2 \chi_0 \frac{e^{i \Delta k \Lambda}-1}{\Delta k} \sum^{N-1}_{n=0} (-1)^n e^{i \Delta k \Lambda n}$

The summation yields

$s=\sum^{N-1}_{n=0} (-1)^n e^{i \Delta k \Lambda n}=1-e^{i \Delta k \Lambda}+e^{i 2 \Delta k \Lambda}-e^{i 3 \Delta k \Lambda}+...+(-1)^N e^{i \Delta k \Lambda (N-2)}-(-1)^N e^{i \Delta k \Lambda (N-1)}.$

Multiplying both sides of the above equation by a factor of $e^{i \Delta k \Lambda}$ leads to

$s e^{i \Delta k \Lambda}=e^{i \Delta k \Lambda} -e^{i 2 \Delta k \Lambda}+e^{i 3 \Delta k \Lambda}+...+(-1)^N e^{i \Delta k \Lambda (N-1)}-(-1)^N e^{i \Delta k \Lambda N}.$

Adding both equation leads to the relation

$s(1+e^{i \Delta k \Lambda})=1-(-1)^N e^{i \Delta k \Lambda N}.$

Solving for $s$ gives

$s=\frac{1-(-1)^N e^{i \Delta k \Lambda N} }{1+e^{i \Delta k \Lambda}},$

which leads to

$A_2=-i A_1^2 \chi_0 \left( \frac{e^{i \Delta k \Lambda}-1}{\Delta k} \right)\left(\frac{1-(-1)^N e^{i \Delta k \Lambda N}}{e^{i \Delta k \Lambda}+1}\right).$

The total SHG intensity can be expressed by

$I_2=A_2 A_2^*= \left|A_{1}\right|^{4} \chi_0^2 \Lambda^2 \mbox{sinc}^2(\Delta k \Lambda/2) \left(\frac{1-(-1)^N \cos(\Delta k \Lambda N)}{1+\cos(\Delta k \Lambda)} \right).$

For the case of $\Lambda=\frac{\pi}{\Delta k}$ the right part of the above equation is undefined so the limit needs to be taken when $\Delta k \Lambda \rightarrow \pi$ by invoking L'Hôpital's rule.

$\lim_{\Delta k \Lambda\to\pi}\frac{1-(-1)^N \cos(\Delta k \Lambda N)}{1+\cos(\Delta k \Lambda)}=N^2$

Which leads to the signal intensity

$I_2=\frac{4 \left|A_{1}\right|^{4} \chi_0^2 L^2}{\pi^2}.$

In order to allow different domain widths, i.e. $\Lambda=\frac{m \pi}{\Delta k}$, for $m=1,3,5,...$, the above equation becomes

$I_2=A_2 A_2^*= \left|A_{1}\right|^{4}\chi_0^2 \Lambda^2 \mbox{sinc}^2(m \Delta k \Lambda/2) \left(\frac{1-(-1)^N \cos(m \Delta k \Lambda N)}{1+\cos(m \Delta k \Lambda)} \right).$

With $\Lambda = \frac{m \pi}{\Delta k}$ the intensity becomes

$I_2=\frac{4 \left|A_{1}\right|^{4} \chi_0^2 L^2}{m^2 \pi^2}.$

This allows quasi-phase-matching to exist at different domain widths $\Lambda$. From this equation it is apparent, however, that as the quasi-phase match order $m$ increases, the efficiency decreases by $m^2$. For example, for 3rd order quasi-phase matching only a third of the crystal is effectively used for the generation of signal frequency, as a consequence the amplitude of the signal wavelength only third of the amount of amplitude for same length crystal for 1st order quasi-phase match.

== Calculation of domain width ==
The domain width is calculated through the use of Sellmeier equation and using wavevector relations. In the case of DFG this relationship holds true $\Delta k = k_1 - k_2 - k_3$, where $k_1, k_2, \mbox{and } k_3$ are the pump, signal, and idler wavevectors, and $k_i = \frac{2 \pi n(\lambda_i)}{\lambda_i}$. By calculating $\Delta k$ for the different frequencies, the domain width can be calculated from the relationship $\Lambda = \frac{\pi}{\Delta k}$.

== Orthogonal quasi-phase-matching ==
This method enables the generation of high-purity hyperentangled two-photon state. In orthogonal quasi-phase matching (OQPM), a thin-layered crystal structure is combined with periodic poling along orthogonal directions. By combining periodic down-conversion of orthogonally polarized photons along with periodic poling that corrects the phase mismatch, the structure self corrects for longitudinal walk-off (delay) as it happens and before it accumulates. The superimposed spontaneous parametric downconversion (SPDC) radiation of the superlattice creates high-purity two-photon entangled state.
