= Sum-frequency generation =

Nonlinear optical process

Sum-frequency generation (SFG) is a second order nonlinear optical process based on the mixing of two input photons at frequencies $\omega_1$ and $\omega_2$ to generate a third photon at frequency $\omega_3$. As with any $\chi^{(2)}$ optical phenomenon in nonlinear optics, this can only occur under conditions where: the light is interacting with matter, that lacks centrosymmetry (for example, surfaces and interfaces); the light has a very high intensity (typically from a pulsed laser). Sum-frequency generation is a "parametric process", meaning that the photons satisfy energy conservation, leaving the matter unchanged, $\hbar\omega_3 = \hbar\omega_1 + \hbar\omega_2$. It is the basis of experimental techniques such as sum frequency generation spectroscopy.

== Second-harmonic generation ==
A special case of sum-frequency generation is second-harmonic generation, in which $\omega_1=\omega_2$. In fact, in experimental physics, this is the most common type of sum-frequency generation. This is because in second-harmonic generation, only one input light beam is required, but if $\omega_1\neq\omega_2$, two simultaneous beams are required, which can be more difficult to arrange. In practice, the term "sum-frequency generation" usually refers to the less common case in which $\omega_1\neq\omega_2$.

== Phase-matching ==
For sum-frequency generation to occur efficiently, phase-matching conditions must be satisfied:

$$\hbar k_3 \approx \hbar k_1 + \hbar k_2$$

where $k_1,k_2,k_3$ are the angular wavenumbers of the three waves as they travel through the medium. (Note that the equation resembles the equation for conservation of momentum.) As this condition is satisfied more and more accurately, the sum-frequency generation becomes more and more efficient.

== Sum frequency generation spectroscopy ==
Sum frequency generation spectroscopy uses two laser beams mixed at an interface to generate an output beam with a frequency equal to the sum of the two input frequencies. Sum frequency generation spectroscopy is used to analyze surfaces and interfaces, carrying complementary information to infrared and Raman spectroscopy.
