= Gurgen Askaryan =

Soviet-Armenian physicist

- Գուրգեն Ասկարյան
- Born: Gurgen Ashotovich Askaryan; 14 December 1928; Moscow, Soviet Union
- Died: 2 March 1997 (aged 68); Moscow, Russia
- Education: Moscow State University; Lebedev Physical Institute
- Known for: Self-focusing; Askaryan radiation
- Scientific career
- Fields: Physics
- Workplaces: Lebedev Physical Institute
- Doctoral advisors: Matvei Rabinovich; Yakov Zeldovich

Gurgen Ashotovich Askaryan (Armenian: Գուրգեն Ասկարյան; Russian: Гурген Аскарьян or Гурген Аскарян) (14 December 1928 – 2 March 1997) was a prominent Soviet-Armenian physicist, known for his discovery of the self-focusing of light, pioneering studies of light–matter interactions, and the discovery and investigation of the interaction of high-energy particles with condensed matter. (See Askaryan effect)

== Biography ==
Gurgen Askaryan was born in 1928 in Moscow, Russia to Armenian parents. Both parents were doctors: father Ashot Askaryan, was a general practitioner, and his mother Astgik Askaryan was a dentist. At the age of 18 Gurgen entered the Department of Physics at the Moscow State University, where he started his first research project specializing in the physics of atomic nuclei. Graduated in 1952 and was accepted to the graduate school at the Institute of Chemical Physics (ICP) in Moscow. In 1953, he was transferred to the Lebedev Institute of Physics, and graduated with PhD in 1957. An author of over 200 articles, Askaryan made a significant contribution to the field of high energy physics (see Askaryan effect and ANITA (Antarctic Impulsive Transient Antenna)), acoustics, and optics. For his famous discovery of the self-focusing of light, he received the highest scientific award at the time in the Soviet Union. Shortly after receiving a degree of the Doctor of Science in 1992, Gurgen experienced health problems, which were also accompanied by the worsening of his sister Gohar's health. He and his sister died on the same day on 2 March 1997 in their apartment in Moscow, both because of similar heart diseases.

== Scientific career and achievements ==
=== Missed Nobel Prize ===
During the third year of his education G. Askaryan proposed a new method of registration of fast charged particles. His idea was the following. Suppose, there is an overheated transparent liquid. A very small amount of energy is sufficient to make it boil. Let a fast charged particle penetrate through this overheated liquid. The particle expends its energy on ionization of atoms located near its trajectory. This energy loss is transformed into heat in amount which is sufficient to induce boiling along particle's trajectory. Then the trajectory becomes observable because many bubbles are created along it.

G. Askaryan discussed this proposal with some of his teachers and fellow students. No one objected. However, no one supported him, no one helped to realize the idea. G. Askaryan then was inexperienced in forms and methods of scientific investigation. He even did not publish his proposal. Several years later, in 1952, the same idea was set forth independently by an American physicist Donald Arthur Glaser. He put the idea into practice having assembled the device known now as bubble chamber. This instrument proved to be so useful in high energy physics that D. A. Glazer was awarded with the Nobel Prize in 1960. This event gave rise to Askaryan's deep concern. Of course, he was shaken that Nobel Prize was so near and, so to say, he let it slip. On the other hand, this event helped him to get faith in himself.

=== Cosmic rays and sound waves ===
G. Askaryan discovered and investigated in details various effects accompanying passage of high energy particles through dense matter (liquids or solids). He showed that hadron-electron-photon showers and even single fast particles may produce sound pulses. Ionization losses are quickly converted into heat, and the small region adjacent to trajectory undergoes quick thermal expansion thus generating sound waves. These results gave a new approach to the study of cosmic rays. Before, investigations of cosmic rays were based on direct interaction of cosmic ray particle with a detector. Askaryan's results made it possible to detect showers and single particles using sound receivers situated at some distance from the event.

Several years ago, the registration of energetic particles and showers with sound detectors in sea water was planned as an important part of global monitoring.

=== Cosmic rays and electromagnetic waves ===
G. Askaryan also showed that cosmic ray showers emit electromagnetic radiation, thus giving yet another way for their detection. Before him it was commonly assumed that electron-photon showers do not emit electromagnetic radiation since the electrons and positrons are created in pairs. Askaryan's analysis led to the conclusion that in an electron-photon shower there is an excess of negative charge (excess of electrons). These excess electrons are knocked out from atoms either by photoeffect or by shower electrons and positrons (ionization). At the same time, due to the annihilation process the number of positrons decreases. Thus, there is an electric current created by the excess electrons associated with shower. This variable current is the source of electromagnetic radiation. Therefore, every shower is the source of electromagnetic radiation. These studies opened new perspectives for distant registration of cosmic ray showers.

These investigations paved the way for distant registration of cosmic ray showers. Now many radio-astronomical stations are conducting observations on cosmic ray showers.

=== Intense laser beams and radiation acoustics ===
Later G. Askaryan showed that intense laser beam passing through matter also generates sound waves. This effect may be used for processing and for destruction of matter. As a result of this series of investigations, a new branch of physics was created, radiation acoustics, and G. Askaryan was the founder.

=== Interaction of laser beam with substances ===
After discovery of lasers, G. Askaryan began to investigate interaction of laser beam with various substances. At that time physicists who worked with lasers, used to break through thin metal specimens (usually, razor blades) with laser beam. It was something like a game. G. Askaryan also rendered tribute to this game. He noticed that holes made by laser beam were of two kinds. When he used laser of moderate power, the edges of aperture were smooth, as if the aperture was melted through (indeed, it was melted). However, the hole made by powerful laser had rough uneven edges, as if the hole was broken through, not melted. At first G. Askaryan supposed that it was the light pressure which knocked out the part of razor blade in the light spot, however, simple estimates showed that the assumption was wrong.

The problem was later cleared up by G. A. Askaryan and E. M. Moroz. The explanation was the following. The beam from a powerful laser heats metallic surface so intensely that surface layer turns into a vapor before the heat penetrates into next layers. The vapor is ejected from the surface. Thereby, a force arises which acts on the part of surface within the spot. This force is numerically equal to the momentum of vapor ejected during a unit of time. Such is the reaction of vapor on the surface. And in the case of powerful laser this reaction is so strong that the metal within the spot is torn out. The reaction of the vapor gives pressure that is many orders greater than the light pressure. Vaporizing ablation is now used for compressing the nuclear fuel in the problem of laser induced controlled thermonuclear reactions.

=== Self-focusing of waves ===
Perhaps one of the most brilliant of Askaryan's discoveries was the self-focusing of light. In the medium with third order nonlinear polarization, the refractive index can be represented as n = n_{0} + n_{2}I, where n_{0} is the linear refractive index, n_{2} is an optical constant characterizing the strength of the optical nonlinearity, and I is the Gaussian intensity profile of the beam. The phenomenon of self-focusing may occur if a beam of light with nonuniform transverse intensity distribution, for example Gaussian profile, propagates through a material in which n_{2} is positive. If a strong beam of light passes through a medium with this type of nonlinearity also called Kerr nonlinearity, then the refractive index of the medium inside the beam is greater than that outside of the beam. If the electric field is strong enough then the beam will create a dielectric waveguide, which reduces or entirely eliminates the divergence of the beam. Askaryan called this effect self-focusing. Discovery of self-focusing opened a new chapter in non-linear electrodynamics and optics.

=== Askaryan effect ===
The Askaryan effect, which was theoretically predicted by Askaryan in 1962, describes a phenomenon, similar to the Cherenkov effect, whereby a particle travelling faster than the speed of light in a dense radiotransparent medium such as salt, ice or the lunar regolith produces a shower of secondary charged particles which contain a charge anisotropy and thus emits a cone of coherent radiation in the radio or microwave part of the electromagnetic spectrum. This phenomenon is of primary interest in using bulk matter to detect ultra-high energy neutrinos.

=== Other ===
Askaryan was the first to note that the outer few metres of the Moon's surface, known as the regolith, would be a sufficiently transparent medium for detecting microwaves from the charge excess in particle showers. The radio transparency of the regolith has since been confirmed by the Apollo missions.

Askaryan also found (together with M. L. Levin) a combination of auxiliary high-frequency elds which could secure stability of electron bunch during acceleration.

== Selected works ==
Source: ISI Web of Knowledge

1. Askaryan GA, 'O GENERATSII RADIOVOLN MILLIMETROVOGO DIAPAZONA PRI PROKHOZHDENII ELEKTRONNOGO SGUSTKA CHEREZ TORMOZYASHCHUYU SREDU', ZHURNAL EKSPERIMENTALNOI I TEORETICHESKOI FIZIKI 27 (6): 761-761 1954
2. Askaryan GA, 'ACCELERATION OF CHARGED PARTICLES IN RUNNING OR STANDING ELECTROMAGNETIC WAVES', SOVIET PHYSICS JETP-USSR 9 (2): 430-430 1959
3. Askaryan GA, 'RADIATION OF VOLUME AND SURFACE COMPRESSION WAVES DURING IMPINGEMENT OF A NONRELATIVISTIC ELECTRON STREAM AT THE SURFACE OF A DENSE MEDIUM', SOVIET PHYSICS-TECHNICAL PHYSICS 4 (2): 234-235 1959
4. Askaryan GA, 'ELECTROMAGNETIC RADIATION FROM ELECTRON DIFFUSION', SOVIET PHYSICS JETP-USSR 12 (1): 151-152 1961
5. Askaryan GA, 'DIAMAGNETIC PERTURBATIONS IN MEDIA CAUSED BY IONIZING RADIATION', SOVIET PHYSICS JETP-USSR 14 (1): 135-137 1962
6. Askaryan GA,'INTERACTION BETWEEN LASER RADIATION AND OSCILLATING SURFACES', SOVIET PHYSICS JETP-USSR 15 (6): 1161-1162 1962
7. Askaryan GA,'EXCESS NEGATIVE CHARGE OF AN ELECTRON-PHOTON SHOWER AND ITS COHERENT RADIO EMISSION', SOVIET PHYSICS JETP-USSR 14 (2): 441-443 1962
8. Askaryan GA,'CERENKOV RADIATION AND TRANSITION RADIATION FROM ELECTROMAGNETIC WAVES', SOVIET PHYSICS JETP-USSR 15 (5): 943-946 1962
9. Askaryan GA, IOVNOVICH ML, LEVIN ML, et al.,'TRANSPORT AND CONTAINMENT OF MOVING PLASMA CONCENTRATIONS (HIGH FREQUENCY AND MAGNETIC PLASMA WAVE-GUIDES)', NUCLEAR FUSION : 797-800 Suppl. 2 1962
10. Askaryan GA,'PROJECTION OF PLASMOIDS THROUGH MAGNETIC FIELDS (MAGNETODYNAMIC TRAPS)', SOVIET PHYSICS-TECHNICAL PHYSICS 7 (6): 492& 1962
11. Askaryan GA, PROKHOROV AM, CHANTURIYA GF, et al.,'THE EFFECTS OF A LASER BEAM IN A LIQUID', SOVIET PHYSICS JETP-USSR 17 (6): 1463-1465 1963
12. Askaryan GA,'DIRECTED COHERENT RADIATION DUE TO BREAKDOWN NEAR THE TRACK OF AN IONIZING PARTICLE', SOVIET PHYSICS JETP-USSR 17 (4): 901-902 1963
13. Askaryan GA,'EXCITATION AND DISSOCIATION OF MOLECULES IN AN INTENSE LIGHT FIELD', SOVIET PHYSICS JETP-USSR 19 (1): 273-274 1964
14. Askaryan GA,'EMISSION OF RADIO WAVES UPON MODULATION OF AN INTENSE BEAM OF LIGHT IN A MEDIUM', SOVIET PHYSICS JETP-USSR 18 (2): 441-443 1964
15. Askaryan GA,'COHERENT RADIO EMISSION FROM COSMIC SHOWERS IN AIR AND IN DENSE MEDIA', SOVIET PHYSICS JETP-USSR 21 (3): 658& 1965
16. Askaryan GA, GOLTS EY, RABINOVI.MS, 'USE OF ARTIFICIAL METEORS FOR LASER PUMPING', JETP LETTERS-USSR 4 (11): 305& 1966
17. Askaryan GA, 'OPTOCALORIC EFFECT (AMPLIFICATION OF ATOMIC INTERACTION AND COOLING OF MEDIUM) IN A LASER BEAM', JETP LETTERS-USSR 3 (4): 105& 1966
18. Askaryan GA, 'SELF-FOCUSING AND FOCUSING OF ULTRASOUND AND HYPERSOUND', JETP LETTERS-USSR 4 (4): 99& 1966
19. Askaryan GA,'SELF-FOCUSING OF A LIGHT BEAM UPON EXCITATION OF ATOMS AND MOLECULES OF MEDIUM IN BEAM' JETP LETTERS-USSR 4 (10): 270& 1966
20. Askaryan GA, RABINOVI.MS, SMIRNOVA AD, et al.,'CURRENTS PRODUCED BY LIGHT PRESSURE WHEN A LASER BEAM ACTS ON MATTER' JETP LETTERS-USSR 5 (4): 93& 1967
21. Askaryan GA, 'NONLINEARITY OF MEDIA DUE TO INDUCED DEFORMATION OF MOLECULES ATOMS AND PARTICLES OF A MEDIUM', JETP LETTERS-USSR 6 (5): 157& 1967
22. Askaryan GA, 'WAVEGUIDE PROPERTIES OF A TUBULAR LIGHT BEAM', SOVIET PHYSICS JETP-USSR 28 (4): 732& 1969
23. Askaryan GA, STUDENOV VB,'BANANA SELF FOCUSING OF BEAMS', JETP LETTERS-USSR 10 (3): 71& 1969
24. Askaryan GA, CHISTYI IL,'THERMAL SELF-FOCUSING IN A LIGHT BEAM WITH LOW INTENSITY NEAR AXIS', SOVIET PHYSICS JETP-USSR 31 (1): 76& 1970
25. Askaryan GA, PUSTOVOI.VI,'SELF-FOCUSING AND FOCUSING OF ULTRASOUND AND HYPERSOUND IN METALS AND SEMICONDUCTORS', SOVIET PHYSICS JETP-USSR 31 (2): 346& 1970
26. ARUTYUNYAN.IN, Askaryan GA, POGOSYAN VA, 'MULTIPHOTON PROCESSES IN FOCUS OF AN INTENSE LASER BEAM WITH EXPANSION OF INTERACTIVE REGION TAKEN INTO CONSIDERATION', SOVIET PHYSICS JETP-USSR 31 (3): 548& 1970
27. Askaryan GA, STEPANOV VK, 'SIMULTANEOUS EXTENDED ACTION OF A HIGH-POWER LIGHT BEAM ON MATTER', SOVIET PHYSICS JETP-USSR 32 (2): 198& 1971
28. Askaryan GA, 'SELF-FOCUSING OF POWERFUL SOUND DURING PRODUCTION OF BUBBLES'JETP LETTERS-USSR 13 (7): 283& 1971
29. Askaryan GA, TARASOVA NM, 'INITIAL STAGE OF OPTICAL EXPLOSION OF A MATERIAL PARTICLE IN AN INTENSE LIGHT FLUX', SOVIET PHYSICS JETP-USSR 33 (2): 336& 1971
30. Askaryan GA, DIYANOV KA, MUKHAMAD.M,'NEW EXPERIMENTS ON FORMATION OF A SELF-FOCUSING FILAMENT FROM FOCUS OF BEAM ON SURFACE OF A MEDIUM', JETP LETTERS-USSR 14 (8): 308& 1971
31. Askaryan GA, RAKHMANI.TG,'SCATTERING, REFRACTION AND REFLECTION OF SOUND UNDER ACTION OF INTENSE LIGHT ON MEDIUM', SOVIET PHYSICS JETP-USSR 34 (3): 639& 1972
32. Askaryan GA, MANUKYAN SD, 'PARTICLE ACCELERATION BY A MOVING LASER FOCUS, FOCUSING FRONT OR FRONT OF AN ULTRASHORT LASER PULSE', ZHURNAL EKSPERIMENTALNOI I TEORETICHESKOI FIZIKI 62 (6): 2156-2160 1972
33. Askaryan GA, 'EFFECT OF SELF-FOCUSING', USPEKHI FIZICHESKIKH NAUK 111 (2): 249-260 1973
34. Askaryan GA, DIYANOV KA, MUKHAMAD.MA, 'SUPPRESSION OF NONLINEAR PROCESSES OF STIMULATED SCATTERING, BEAM COLLAPSE, AND BREAKDOWN OF MEDIUM DURING BEAM SCANNING - SELF-FOCUSING OF STROLLING-BEAMS', JETP LETTERS 19 (5): 172-174 1974
35. Askaryan GA, NAMIOT VA, RABINOVI.MS, 'UTILIZATION OF OVERCOMPRESSION OF A SUBSTANCE BY LIGHT-REACTIVE PRESSURE FOR PREPARATION OF MICROCRITICAL MASS OF FISSIONABLE ELEMENTS, SUPER-STRONG MAGNETIC-FIELDS AND PARTICLE ACCELERATION', USPEKHI FIZICHESKIKH NAUK 113 (4): 716-718 1974
36. Askaryan GA, NAMIOT VA, 'COMPRESSION AND FOCUSING OF A NEUTRON GAS BY MOVING MODERATOR', JETP LETTERS 20 (5): 148-149 1974
37. Askaryan GA, DOLGOSHEIN BA, 'ACOUSTIC REGISTRATION OF HIGH-ENERGY NEUTRINOS', JETP LETTERS 25 (5): 213-214 1977
38. Askaryan GA, DOLGOSHEIN VA,'MICROELECTROSTRICTION IN AN IONIZED MEDIUM', JETP LETTERS 28 (10): 571-574 1978
39. Askaryan GA, RAEVSKII IM, 'EXCITATION OF HIGH-FREQUENCY OSCILLATIONS BY A LASER-PULSE', JETP LETTERS 32 (2): 104-108 1980
40. Askaryan GA, MUKHAMADZHANOV MA, 'NON-LINEAR DEFOCUSING OF A FOCUSED BEAM - A FINE BEAM FROM THE FOCUS', JETP LETTERS 33 (1): 44-48 1981
41. Askaryan GA, 'INCREASE OF LASER AND OTHER RADIATION TRANSMISSIONS THROUGH SOFT OPAQUE PHYSICAL AND BIOLOGICAL MEDIA', KVANTOVAYA ELEKTRONIKA 9 (7): 1379-1383 1982
42. Askaryan GA, MANZON BM, 'LASER DRAGON DIRECTED BY THE BEAM OF LIGHT DISCHARGE EJECTION INTO THE ATMOSPHERE', USPEKHI FIZICHESKIKH NAUK 139 (2): 370-372 1983
43. Askaryan GA, 'NEUTRINO STUDY OF THE EARTH, THE NEUTRINO GEOLOGY', USPEKHI FIZICHESKIKH NAUK 144 (3): 523-530 1984
44. Askaryan GA, 'DECAY OF A HIGH-ENERGY PION BEAM IN A MEDIUM - FORMATION OF A DECAY CHANNEL', JETP LETTERS 41 (12): 651-654 1985
45. Askaryan GA, YURKIN AV, 'NEW STUDIES IN OPTOTHERMOACOUSTICS', JETP LETTERS 43 (4): 221-225 FEB 25 1986
46. Askaryan GA, 'Cherenkov Radiation FROM OPTICAL PULSES', Physical Review Letters 57 (19): 2470-2470 NOV 10 1986
47. Askaryan GA, RAEVSKII IM, 'LASER SIMULATION OF THE LIGHT AND PLASMA ACTION ON COMETS AND PLANETS', KVANTOVAYA ELEKTRONIKA 14 (2): 229-231 FEB 1987
48. Askaryan GA, BATANOV GM, KOSSYI IA, et al., 'CONSEQUENCES OF MICROWAVE EMISSIONS IN THE STRATOSPHERE', USPEKHI FIZICHESKIKH NAUK 156 (2): 370-372 OCT 1988
49. Askaryan GA, YURKIN AV, 'NANOSECOND PHOTOGRAPHY OF FAST PROCESSES IN INVISIBLE (UV) LIGHT WITH A NITROGEN LASER AND NEW STUDY OF A TRAIN OF SHOCK-WAVES', JETP LETTERS 58 (7): 563-567 OCT 10 1993
50. Askaryan GA, Bulanov SV, Dudnikova GI, et al., 'Magnetic interaction of ultrashort high-intensity laser pulses in plasmas', PLASMA PHYSICS AND CONTROLLED FUSION 39 (5A): 137-144 Sp. Iss. SI MAY 1997

== See also ==
- Askaryan effect
