= Photoionization mode =

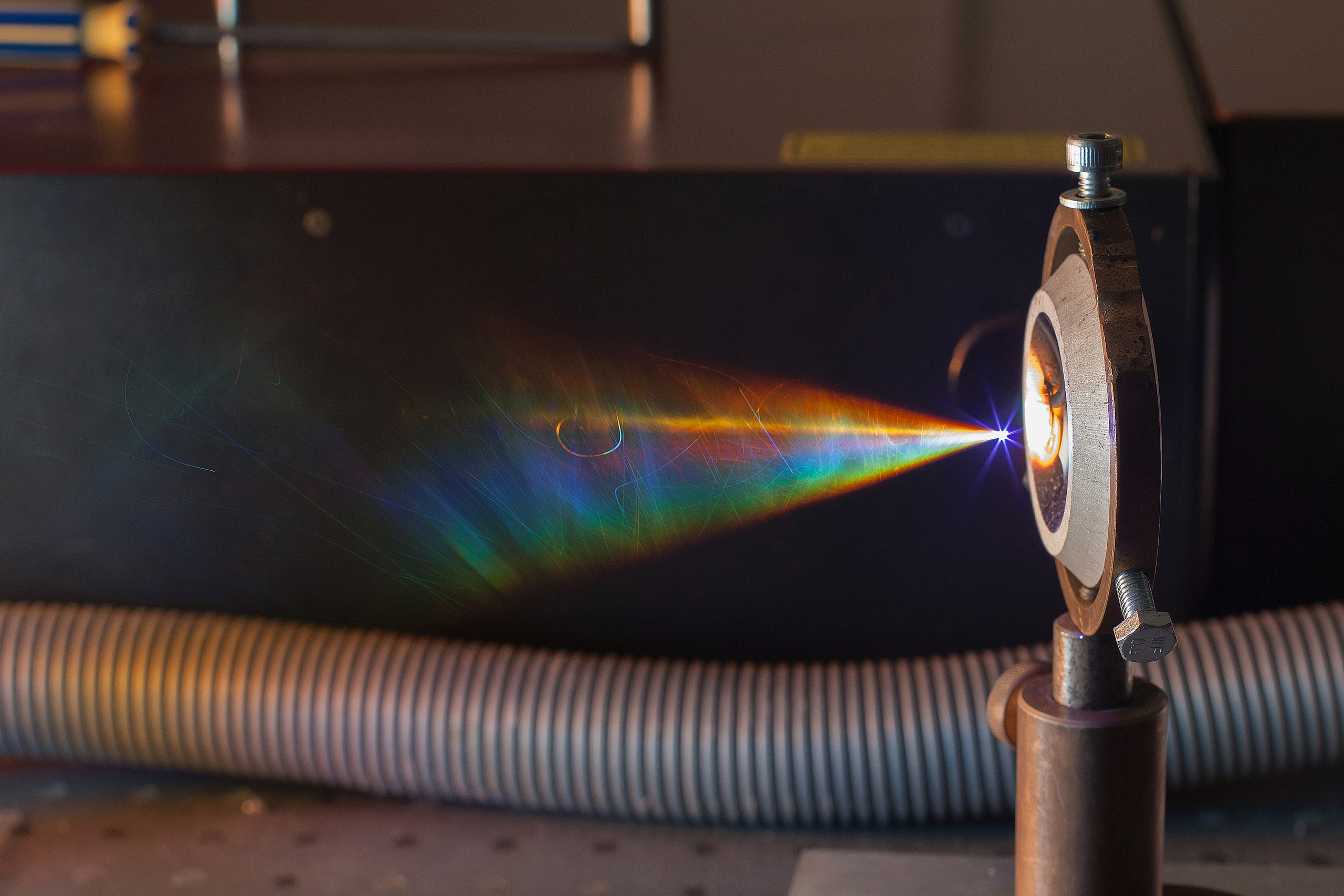
The photo shows a femtosecond laser spark and the supercontinuum formed by the femtosecond laser spark

A photoionization mode is a mode of interaction between a laser beam and matter involving photoionization.

== General considerations ==
Laser light affects materials of all types through fundamental processes such as excitation, ionization, and dissociation of atoms and molecules. These processes depend on the properties of the light, as well as on the properties of the material. Using lasers for material processing requires understanding and being able to control these fundamental effects. A better understanding can be achieved by defining distinct interaction regimes, hence the definition of four photoionization modes.

This new way of looking at the laser interaction with matter was first proposed by Tiberius Brastaviceanu in 2006, after his description of the "filamentary ionization mode" (Sherbrooke University, 2005). In his Master's work he provided the empirical proof of the formation of filamentary distributions of solvated electrons in water, induced by high-power fs (femtosecond, one quadrillionth of a second) laser pulses in the self-focusing propagation regime, and described the theoretical context in which this phenomenon can be explained and controlled. Refer to main article on filament propagation.

== Single-photon photoionization mode ==
The SP mode is obtained at small wavelengths (UV, X-ray), or high energy per photon, and at low intensity levels. The only photoionization process involved in this case is the single-photon ionization.

== Optical breakdown photoionization mode ==
The OB mode is observed when a material is subjected to powerful laser pulses. It manifests a power threshold in the range of MW for the majority of dielectric materials, which depends on the duration and on the wavelength of the laser pulse. Optical breakdown is related to the dielectric breakdown phenomenon which was studied and modeled successfully towards the end of the 1950s. One describes the effect as a strong local ionization of the medium, where the plasma reaches densities beyond the critical value (between 10^{20} and 10^{22} electrons/cm³). Once the plasma critical density is achieved, energy is very efficiently absorbed from the light pulse, and the local plasma temperature increases dramatically. An explosive Coulombian expansion follows, and forms a very powerful and damaging shockwave through the material that develops on ns timescale. In liquids, it produces cavitation bubbles. If the rate of plasma formation is relatively slow, in the nanosecond time regime (for nanosecond excitation laser pulses), energy is transferred from the plasma to the lattice, and thermal damages can occur. In the femtosecond time regime (for femtosecond excitation laser pulses) the plasma expansion happens on a timescale smaller than the rate of energy transfer to the lattice, and thermal damages are reduced or eliminated. This is the basis of cold laser machining using high-power sub-ps laser sources.

The optical breakdown is a very "violent" phenomenon and changes drastically the structure of the surrounding medium. To the naked eye, optical breakdown looks like a spark and if the event happens in air or some other fluid, it is even possible to hear a short noise (burst) caused by the explosive plasma expansion.

There are several photoionization processes involved in optical breakdown, which depend on the wavelength, local intensity, and pulse duration, as well as on the electronic structure of the material. First, we should mention that optical breakdown is only observed at very high intensities. For pulse durations greater than a few tens of fs avalanche ionization plays a role. The longer pulse duration, the greater the avalanche ionization's contribution. Multi-photon ionization processes are important in the fs time regime, and their role increases as the pulse duration decreases. The type of multi-photon ionization processes involved is also wavelength dependent.

The theory needed to understand the most important features of optical breakdown are:

- the physics of strong-(laser)field interaction with matter, to account for the plasma formation;
- the physics of strong-(laser)field interaction with plasma, to account for plasma expansion, and for thermal and mechanical effects;
- the geometrical/linear optical theory, to account at the first approximation for the spatial intensity distribution. Non-linear propagation theory is usually invoked to account for self-focusing that occurs in experiments conducted at low numerical aperture, and to account for detail features of the plasma density spatial distribution.

== Below optical breakdown threshold photoionization mode ==
B/OB mode is an intermediary between the optical breakdown mode (OB mode) and the filamentary mode (F mode). The plasma density generated in this mode can go from 0 to the critical value i.e. optical breakdown threshold. Intensities reached inside the B/OB zone can range from multi-photon ionization threshold to the optical breakdown threshold. In the visible-IR domain, B/OB mode is obtained under very tight external focusing (high numerical aperture), to avoid self-focusing, and for intensities below optical breakdown threshold. In the UV regime, where optical breakdown intensity threshold is below self-focusing intensity threshold, tight focusing is not necessary. The shape of the ionization area is similar to that of the focal area of the beam, and can be very small (only a few micrometres). B/OB mode is possible only at short pulse durations, where AI's contribution to the total free electron population is very small. As the pulse duration becomes even shorter, the intensity domain where B/OB is possible becomes even wider.

The principles governing this mode of ionization are very simple. Localized plasma must be generated in predictable fashion, under the optical breakdown threshold. Optical breakdown intensity threshold is strongly correlated to the input intensity only at short pulse durations. Therefore, one important requirement, in order to systematically avoid the optical breakdown, is to operate at short pulse durations. In order for the ionization to take place, multi-photon ionization (MPI) intensity threshold must be reached. The idea is to adjust the duration of the laser pulse so that multi-photon ionization, and perhaps to a lesser extent avalanche ionization, have no time to raise the plasma's density above the critical value.

In the UV, the distinction between single-photon mode (SP) and B/OB is that for the latter multi-photon ionization, single-photon ionization, and perhaps to a lesser extent avalanche ionization, are operating, whereas for the former, only single-photon ionization is operating.

B/OB relies mostly on MPI processes. Therefore, it is more selective than OB in terms of which type of atom or molecule is ionized or dissociated. The theory needed to understand the most important features of B/OB are:

- The physics of strong-(laser)field interaction with matter, to account for the plasma formation. As opposed to the OB mode, in this case the role of avalanche ionization is greatly reduced, and the effects are dominated by multi-photon ionization processes.
- The geometrical/linear optical theory, to account at the first approximation for the spatial intensity distribution. Non-linear propagation theory is usually invoked to account for self-focusing that occurs in experiments conducted at low numerical aperture, and to account for detailed features of plasma spatial distribution.

The B/OB mode was described by A. Vogel et al. [ref 2].

== Filamentary photoionization mode ==
In the F mode, filamentary or linear ionization patterns are formed. The plasma density within these filaments is below the critical value.

The self-focusing effect is responsible for the most important characteristics of the dose distribution. The diameter of these filamentary ionization traces is the same within 20% (in the order of a few micrometres). Their length, their number, and their relative position are controllable parameters. The plasma density and the yield of photolytic species are believed to be homogeneously distributed along these filaments. The local intensity reached by the laser light during propagation is also practically constant along their length. The power range of operation of the F mode is above self-focusing threshold and below optical breakdown threshold. Consequently, a necessary condition for it to exist is that the self-focusing threshold must be smaller than the optical breakdown threshold.

The F mode exhibits very important characteristics, which in combination with the other three photoionization modes makes possible the generation of a wide range of dose distributions, expanding the application range of lasers in the domain of material processing. The F mode is the only mode capable of generating linear ionization traces.

The theory needed to understand the most important features of the F mode are:

- The physics of high-(laser) field interaction with matter, to account for the plasma formation
- The theory of non-linear propagation, to account for the spatial redistribution of the laser light, intensity clamping, and the formation of filaments, as well as for frequency conversion processes.

The first concrete connection between non-linear optical effects, such as the supercontinuum generation, and photoionization was established by A. Brodeur and S.L. Chin [ref 4] in 1999, based on optical experimental data and modeling. In 2002 T. Brastaviceanu published the first direct measurement of the spatial distribution of photoionization induced in the self-focusing regime, in water [ref 5].

== Superposition of photoionization modes ==
It is possible to control the spatial distribution of the dose induced by laser pulses, and the relative yields of primary photolytic species, by controlling the properties of the laser beam. The dose distribution can be conveniently shaped by inducing a superposition of the four modes of photoionization. The mixed ionization modes are: SP-OB, SP-B/OB, and F-OB.

== Sources ==
- Yablonovitch, Eli; Bloembergen, N. (1972-10-02). "Avalanche Ionization and the Limiting Diameter of Filaments Induced by Light Pulses in Transparent Media". Physical Review Letters. 29 (14). American Physical Society (APS): 907–910. Bibcode:1972PhRvL..29..907Y. doi:10.1103/physrevlett.29.907. ISSN 0031-9007.
- Vogel, Alfred; Noack, Joachim; Huettmann, Gereon; Paltauf, Guenther (2002-04-05). "Femtosecond-laser-produced low-density plasmas in transparent biological media: A tool for the creation of chemical, thermal, and thermomechanical effects below the optical breakdown threshold". In Edwards, Glenn S; Neev, Joseph; Ostendorf, Andreas; Sutherland, John C (eds.). Commercial and Biomedical Applications of Ultrafast and Free-Electron Lasers. Vol. 4633. SPIE. p. 23. Bibcode:2002SPIE.4633...23V. doi:10.1117/12.461385. S2CID 135655545.
- Alfano, R. R.; Shapiro, S. L. (1970-03-16). "Observation of Self-Phase Modulation and Small-Scale Filaments in Crystals and Glasses". Physical Review Letters. 24 (11). American Physical Society (APS): 592–594. Bibcode:1970PhRvL..24..592A. doi:10.1103/physrevlett.24.592. ISSN 0031-9007.
- Brodeur, A.; Chin, S. L. (1999-04-01). "Ultrafast white-light continuum generation and self-focusing in transparent condensed media". Journal of the Optical Society of America B. 16 (4). The Optical Society: 637. Bibcode:1999JOSAB..16..637B. doi:10.1364/josab.16.000637. ISSN 0740-3224.
- Description of water photoionization using fs laser pulses at 790 nm in self-focusing regime. Potential applications in the field of radiobiology.; Tiberius Brastavicenu, Sherbrooke University, 2002
