= Mamyshev 2R regenerator =

All-optical regenerator used in optical communications

The Mamyshev 2R regenerator is an all-optical regenerator used in optical communications. In 1998, Pavel V. Mamyshev of Bell Labs proposed and patented the use of self-phase modulation (SPM) for single channel optical pulse reshaping and re-amplification. More recent applications target the field of ultrashort high peak-power pulse generation.

== Design ==
The schematic of the conventional Mamyshev regenerator is shown below. A high-power erbium-doped fiber amplifier (HP-EDFA) boosts the incoming signal to the power (P_{m}) required for optimal peak power equalization of the 'one' symbols. This amplifier can be followed by an optical bandpass filter (not shown in the figure) to reject out-of-band amplified spontaneous emission.

Self-phase modulation induces spectral broadening in a single-mode optical fiber of length L. The chromatic dispersion of this fiber is normal and its value is D. The nonlinear coefficient is γ, and the linear losses are α. Several types of fibers have been successfully tested : non-zero dispersion-shifted fibers, highly nonlinear silica fibers (HNLF), microstructured silica fibers, chalcogenide fibers and tellurite fibers.

At the fiber output, an optical bandpass filter (OBPF) with a FWHM spectral width δf, (defined such that the pulse width at the output is the same as that at the input of the system), is spectrally offset by an amount δλ with respect to the input signal carrier wavelength λ_{0}. This is used to carve into the broadened spectrum, thereby acting as a pulse reshaper.

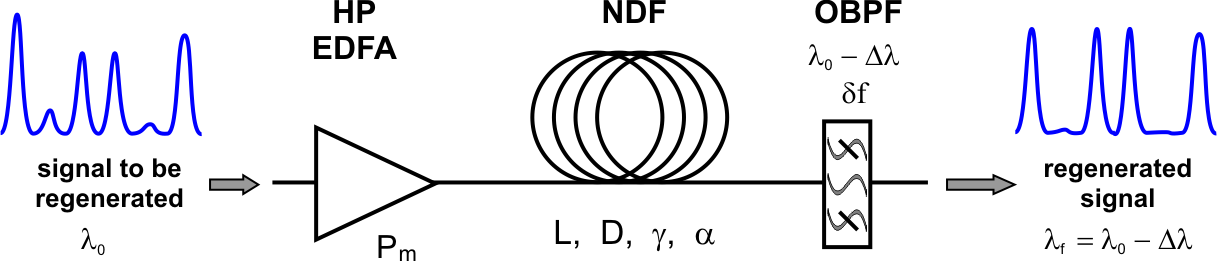
Experimental setup used for the Mamyshev regenerator

This is the unit configuration, which may be repeated for higher accuracy of the regeneration.

Replacing the nonlinear fiber by a highly nonlinear chalcogenide waveguide can be used to produce a photonic chip optical regenerator.

== Principle of operation ==
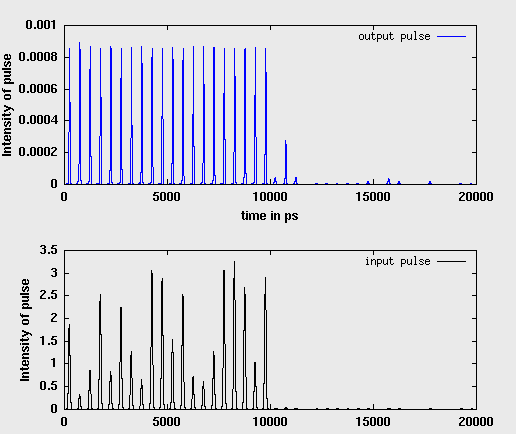
Figure 1: (Lower panel ) Input & (Upper panel) Output/regenerated pulses.

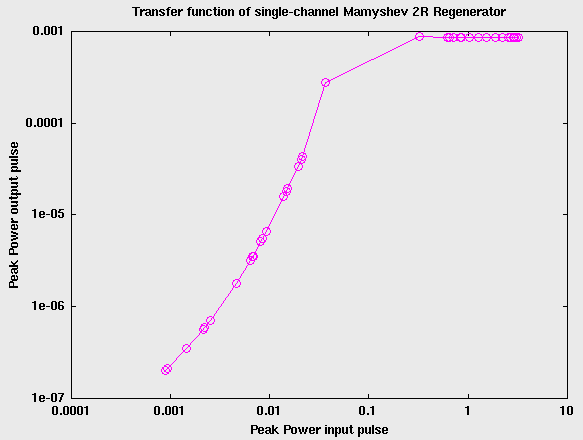
Figure 2:Transfer function relating input output powers for the Mamyshev 2R regenerator.

The Mamyshev regenerator can handle return-to-zero signals with ultrahigh data bit rates. Indeed, thanks to the quasi-instantaneous response of the nonlinear Kerr effect, this regenerator does not suffer from the finite recovery time of some saturable absorbers.

The interest of the Mamyshev regenerator lies in its ability to simultaneously regenerate the 'one' and 'zero' bits of information.

The key effect affecting the pulse evolution in the regenerator is the self-phase modulation that broadens the spectrum in proportion to the intensity of the initial optical pulse. Combined with an output frequency offset OBPF, this constitutes an efficient ultrafast thresholder. Low-intensity noise pulses do not broaden significantly and fall outside of the off-centered filter band. This means that any noise on zeroes in the data stream is eliminated. Conversely, for the ones data pulses the intensity is strong enough that the spectrum is significantly broadened, and a significant portion of the spectrum falls into the OBPF passband, leading to a generation of the output 'one' pulse.

For a careful design of the regenerator and an appropriate combination of filter parameter (spectral offset and bandwidth) / fiber parameter (length, dispersion and nonlinearity values), a reduction of amplitude fluctuations can also be achieved, leading to power equalization of the pulse stream.

The modelling results for the 2R regenerator are shown with the article. In Figure 1, the upper panel shows regenerated pulse from the input (lower panel) for the Mamyshev 2R regenerator. The noisy 1's pulses are boosted to same power levels in the output, while the 0's pulses are reduced to the noise floor.

An important property of a Mamyshev regenerator is its transfer function that links the output peak power to the input peak power. For an efficient operation and power equalization, this transfer function should exhibit a marked plateau at the 1's power level. Example of a transfer function is provided Figure 2.

The spectral operations of broadening, filtering and regeneration about the central wavelength are shown in Figure 3.

In the design of this nonlinear regenerator, care should be given to avoid the consequences of deleterious Brillouin backscattering as well as pulse to pulse interaction leading to patterning effects in the output sequence.

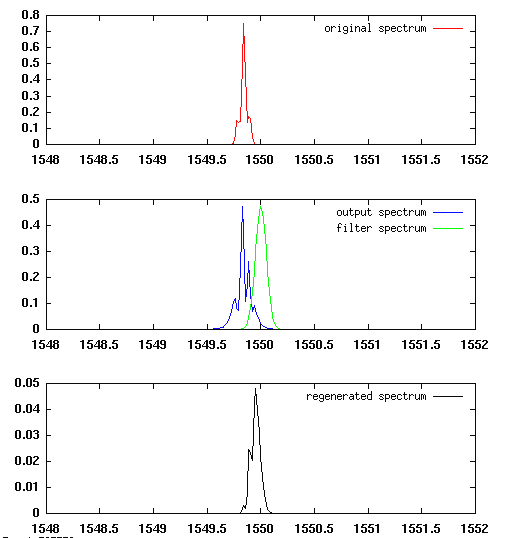
Figure 3: Schematic operator of 2R regenerator in spectral domain. The top plot shows original pulse spectrum at input; middle picture shows pulse broadened by SPM, and filter detuning and filtering region; bottom picture shows the filtered spectrum. The horizontal scale in the wavelengths in nanometers, centered about the telecom wavelength 1550 nm

== Variants ==
Due to the spectral filtering process, the regenerated pulse is intrinsically shifted from the original frequency. This can be beneficial if wavelength conversion is to be achieved simultaneously the regeneration and therefore channel switching can be considered. However, if one wants to recover an output signal having the initial wavelength, an option of applying another regeneration with the BPF center frequency placed at the original channel center frequency allows to overcome this problem. This can be done in a single fiber using a bidirectional propagation in the nonlinear fiber.

=== Multichannel 2R Regeneration ===
The Mamyshev regenerator in its standard configuration is limited to single-wavelength operation in order to prevent from cross-phase modulation (XPM) effects from adjacent channels. Several schemes have been proposed to extend its region of operation to multichannel regime.

In their work on Four-wave mixing (FWM) compensation by using a HLNF and its XPM, Michael Vasilyev and co-workers have proposed, and demonstrated up to 12-channel optical regeneration in 10 Gbit/s systems.

In other work, taking advantage of counter-propagating scheme, double wavelength regeneration has been demonstrated. The number of channels that can be handled has been increased up to four thanks to polarization multiplexing.

Efficient all-optical regeneration based on Mamyshev device has been demonstrated at various repetition rates : 10 Gbit/s, 40 Gbit/s and up to 160 Gbit/s.

The Mamyshev regenerator may suffer from a poor yield : the spectral filtering of the expanded spectrum induces high intrinsic energy loss. In order to compensate those losses, distributed Raman amplification can be involved.

=== 3R regeneration ===
The 2R regeneration can be combined with an additional stage of regeneration to provide 3R regeneration.

Mamyshev technique has also been used for OCDMA transmission and it has been proposed to use the Mamyshev setup in the framework of optical performance monitoring. The reshaping features of the Mamyshev regenerator have also been combined with a polarization attraction process that enables to simultaneously regenerate thepolarization state and the intensity profile of degraded pulse streams.

=== High peak power ultrashort pulse generation ===
The applications of Mamyshev regenerators are not restricted to the field of optical telecommunications. This technique has also been found beneficial in the field of ultrashort and high peak power pulse generation. Indeed, the background improvement and reshaping features of Mamyshev regenerators have opened new perspectives to the use of gain-switched lasers and have allowed subpicosecond pulses with peak powers exceeding the megawatt level to be generated in so-called Mamyshev oscillators. Another example is the contrast enhancement by several orders of magnitude of millijoule femtosecond pulses in argon-filled hollow-core fiber.

=== Concatenation and use in a fiber-based optical oscillator ===
Concatenation of pairs of Mamyshev regenerators has been numerically studied and has shown that well-defined structures could spontaneously emerge from an oscillator architecture, which has then been experimentally confirmed. Additional investigations have focused on the development of ultrashort high peak power fiber lasers and other cavity designs have been considered. In 2017, record peak powers well above the MW level have been reached.
