= Self-phase modulation =

Nonlinear optical effect of light-matter interaction

Self-phase modulation (SPM) is a nonlinear optical effect of light–matter interaction. An ultrashort pulse of light, when travelling in a medium, will induce a varying refractive index of the medium due to the optical Kerr effect. This variation in refractive index will produce a phase shift in the pulse, leading to a change of the pulse's frequency spectrum.

Self-phase modulation is an important effect in optical systems that use short, intense pulses of light, such as lasers and optical fiber communications systems.

Self-phase modulation has also been reported for nonlinear sound waves propagating in biological thin films, where the phase modulation results from varying elastic properties of the lipid films.

== Theory with Kerr nonlinearity ==
The evolution along distance z of the equivalent lowpass electric field A(z) obeys the nonlinear Schrödinger equation which, in absence of dispersion, is:

$$\frac{dA(z)}{dz} = -j\gamma \left| A(z)\right|^2 A(z)$$

with j the imaginary unit and γ the nonlinear coefficient of the medium. The cubic nonlinear term on the right hand side is called Kerr effect, and is multiplied by -j according to the engineer's notation used in the definition of Fourier transform.

The power of the electric field is invariant along z, since:

$$\frac{d |A|^2}{dz}=\frac{dA}{dz}A^* + A\frac{dA^*}{dz} = 0$$

with * denoting conjugation.

Since the power is invariant, the Kerr effect can manifest only as a phase rotation. In polar coordinates, with $A=|A|e^{j\varphi}$, it is:

$$\frac{d|A| e^{j\varphi}}{dz} = \underbrace{\frac{d|A|}{dz}}_{=0}e^{j\varphi} + j |A|e^{j\varphi}\frac{d\varphi}{dz} = -j\gamma \left| A(z)\right|^3 e^{j\varphi}$$

such that:

$$\frac{d\varphi}{dz} = -\gamma|A|^2 .$$

The phase φ at coordinate z therefore is:

$$\varphi(z) = \varphi(0) - \underbrace{\gamma\left| A(0) \right|^2 z}_{\mathrm{SPM}} .$$

Such a relation highlights that SPM is induced by the power of the electric field.

In presence of attenuation α the propagation equation is:

$$\frac{dA(z)}{dz} = -\frac{\alpha}{2}A(z) - j\gamma \left| A(z)\right|^2 A(z)$$

and the solution is:

$$A(z) = A(0) e^{-\frac{\alpha}{2}z} e^{-j\gamma|A(0)|^2 L_\mathrm{eff}(z)}$$

where $L_\mathrm{eff}(z)$ is called effective length and is defined by:

$$L_\mathrm{eff}(z) = \int_0^z e^{-\alpha x} \mathrm{d}x = \frac{1 - e^{-\alpha z}}{\alpha} .$$

Hence, with attenuation the SPM does not grow indefinitely along distance in a homogeneous medium, but eventually saturates to:

$$\lim_{z\rightarrow +\infty} \varphi(z) = \varphi(0) - \gamma|A(0)|^2 \frac{1}{\alpha} .$$

In presence of dispersion the Kerr effect manifests as a phase shift only over short distances, depending on the amount of dispersion.

== SPM Frequency shift ==
A pulse (top curve) propagating through a nonlinear medium undergoes a self-frequency shift (bottom curve) due to self-phase modulation. The front of the pulse is shifted to lower frequencies, the back to higher frequencies. In the centre of the pulse the frequency shift is approximately linear.

For an ultrashort pulse with a Gaussian shape and constant phase, the intensity at time t is given by I(t):

$$I(t) = I_0 \exp \left(- \frac{t^2}{\tau^2} \right)$$

where I_{0} is the peak intensity, and τ is half the pulse duration.

If the pulse is travelling in a medium, the optical Kerr effect produces a refractive index change with intensity:

$$n(I) = n_0 + n_2 \cdot I$$

where n_{0} is the linear refractive index, and n_{2} is the second-order nonlinear refractive index of the medium.

As the pulse propagates, the intensity at any one point in the medium rises and then falls as the pulse goes past. This will produce a time-varying refractive index:

$$\frac{dn(I)}{dt} = n_2 \frac{dI}{dt} = n_2 \cdot I_0 \cdot \frac{-2 t}{\tau^2} \cdot \exp\left(\frac{-t^2}{\tau^2} \right).$$

This variation in refractive index produces a shift in the instantaneous phase of the pulse:

$$\phi(t) = \omega_0 t - kz = \omega_0 t - \frac{2 \pi}{\lambda_0} \cdot n(I) L$$

where $\omega_0$ and $\lambda_0$ are the carrier frequency and (vacuum) wavelength of the pulse, and $L$ is the distance the pulse has propagated.

The phase shift results in a frequency shift of the pulse. The instantaneous frequency ω(t) is given by:

$$\omega(t) = \frac{d \phi(t)}{dt} = \omega_0 - \frac{2 \pi L}{\lambda_0} \frac{dn(I)}{dt},$$

and from the equation for dn/dt above, this is:

$$\omega(t) = \omega_0 + \frac{4 \pi L n_2 I_0}{\lambda_0 \tau^2} \cdot t \cdot \exp\left(\frac{-t^2}{\tau^2}\right).$$

Plotting ω(t) shows the frequency shift of each part of the pulse. The leading edge shifts to lower frequencies ("redder" wavelengths), trailing edge to higher frequencies ("bluer") and the very peak of the pulse is not shifted. For the centre portion of the pulse (between t = ±τ/2), there is an approximately linear frequency shift (chirp) given by:

$$\omega(t) = \omega_0 + \alpha \cdot t$$

where α is:

$$\alpha = \left. \frac{d\omega}{dt} \right |_0 = \frac{4 \pi L n_2 I_0}{\lambda_0 \tau^2}.$$

It is clear that the extra frequencies generated through SPM broaden the frequency spectrum of the pulse symmetrically. In the time domain, the envelope of the pulse is not changed, however in any real medium the effects of dispersion will simultaneously act on the pulse. In regions of normal dispersion, the "redder" portions of the pulse have a higher velocity than the "blue" portions, and thus the front of the pulse moves faster than the back, broadening the pulse in time. In regions of anomalous dispersion, the opposite is true, and the pulse is compressed temporally and becomes shorter. This effect can be exploited to some degree (until it digs holes into the spectrum) to produce ultrashort pulse compression.

A similar analysis can be carried out for any pulse shape, such as the hyperbolic secant-squared (sech^{2}) pulse profile generated by most ultrashort pulse lasers.

If the pulse is of sufficient intensity, the spectral broadening process of SPM can balance with the temporal compression due to anomalous dispersion and reach an equilibrium state. The resulting pulse is called an optical soliton.

== Applications of SPM ==
Self-phase modulation has stimulated many applications in the field of ultrashort pulse including to cite a few:

- spectral broadening and supercontinuum
- temporal pulse compression
- spectral pulse compression

The nonlinear properties of Kerr nonlinearity has also been beneficial for various optical pulse processing techniques such as optical regeneration or wavelength conversion.

== Mitigation strategies in DWDM systems ==
In long-haul single-channel and DWDM (dense wavelength-division multiplexing) systems, SPM is one of the most important reach-limiting nonlinear effects. It can be reduced by:

- Lowering the optical power at the expense of decreasing the optical signal-to-noise ratio
- Dispersion management, because dispersion can partly mitigate the SPM effect

== See also ==
Other non-linear effects:

- Cross-phase modulation – XPM
- Four-wave mixing – FWM
- Modulational instability – MI
- Stimulated Raman scattering – SRS

Applications of SPM:

- Mamyshev 2R regenerator
- Supercontinuum
