= B Integral =

In nonlinear optics, B-Integral is a measure of the nonlinear optics phase shift of light. It calculates the exponential growth of the least stable spatial frequency in a laser beam, and is the numerical equivalent of the nonlinear phase shift along the laser system's optical axis.

In a multipass laser system as a cumulative measure of the nonlinear interaction, this integral is given by:

$$B=\frac{2\pi}{\lambda}\int \! n_2I(z)\,dz \,$$

where $I(z)$ is the optical intensity along the beam axis, $z$ the position in beam direction, and $n_2$ the nonlinear index quantifying the Kerr nonlinearity. As $n_2I(z)$ is the nonlinear change in the refractive index, one easily recognizes the B integral to be the total on-axis nonlinear phase shift accumulated in a passage through the device. The B integral is frequently used in the context of ultrafast amplifiers, e.g. for optical components such as the Pockels cell of a regenerative amplifier.

== See also ==
- Kerr effect
