= Filament propagation =

Diffractionless propagation of a light beam

In nonlinear optics, filament propagation is propagation of a beam of light through a medium without diffraction. This is possible because the Kerr effect causes an index of refraction change in the medium, resulting in self-focusing of the beam.

Filamentary damage tracks in glass caused by laser pulses were first observed by Michael Hercher in 1964. Filament propagation of laser pulses in the atmosphere was observed in 1994 by Gérard Mourou and his team at University of Michigan. The balance between the self-focusing refraction and self-attenuating diffraction by ionization and rarefaction of a laser beam of terawatt intensities, created by chirped pulse amplification, in the atmosphere creates "filaments" which act as waveguides for the beam thus preventing divergence. Competing theories, that the observed filament was actually an illusion created by an axiconic (bessel) or moving focus instead of a "waveguided" concentration of the optical energy, were put to rest by workers at Los Alamos National Laboratory in 1997. Though sophisticated models have been developed to describe the filamentation process, a model proposed by Akozbek et al. provides a semi-analytical and easy to understand solution for the propagation of strong laser pulses in the air.

Filament propagation in a semiconductor medium can also be observed in large aperture vertical cavity surface emitting lasers.

== Femtosecond laser filamentation in gaseous media ==
=== Self-focusing ===
A laser beam traversing a medium can modulate the refractive index of medium as

$$n =  { n_0 + \bar{n}_2I}$$

where $n_0$, $\bar{n}_2$ and $I$ are linear refractive index, second order refractive index and intensity of propagating laser field respectively. Self-focusing occurs when the phase shift due to the Kerr effect compensates for the phase shift because of Gaussian beam divergence. Phase change due to diffraction for a Gaussian beam after traversing a length of $\Delta z$ is

$$\phi_{diffraction}={k\Delta z\over 2\rho_0^2}r^2$$

and phase change because of Kerr effect is

$$\phi_{Kerr}={2\pi\bar{n}_2I_0\Delta z\over \lambda}exp({-2r^2\over w_0^2}) \approx {2\pi\bar{n}_2I_0\Delta z\over \lambda}(1-{2r^2\over w_0^2})$$.

where $k={2\pi n_0\over \lambda}$, $\rho_0={\pi w_0^2n_0\over\lambda}$(Rayleigh range) and $w_0$ is the waist of Gaussian beam. For self-focusing to happen the one have to satisfy the condition of $r^2$ terms be equal in magnitude for both Kerr and diffraction phases. Hence

$$I_0={w_0^2\over 4\rho_0^2\bar{n}_2}$$.

On the other hand, we know that area of a Gaussian beam at its waist is $\pi w_0^2\over 2$. Therefore

$$P_{c}={\lambda^2\over 8\pi n_0 \bar{n}_2}$$.

Note

$$\bar{n}_2 \left({cm^2\over W}\right)=n_2n_0\epsilon_0c$$

Self-focusing needs a laser peak power higher than the critical power $P_{c}$ (order of gigawatts in air), however, for infrared (IR) nanosecond pulses with peak powers higher than the critical power self-focusing is not possible. Multiphoton ionization, inverse Bremsstrahlung and electron avalanche ionization are three major results of gas and laser interaction. The later two processes are collisional-type interactions and take time to accomplish (picosecond to nanosecond). A nanosecond pulse is long enough to develop the air breakdown before the power reaches the GW order required for self-focusing. Breakdown of gas produces plasma that has absorbing and reflecting effect so self-focusing is prohibited.

== Re-focusing during the propagation of a focused short laser pulse ==
An interesting phenomenon related to the filament propagation is the refocusing of focused laser pulses after the geometrical focus. Gaussian beam propagation predicts an increasing beam width bidirectionally away from the geometric focus. However, in the situation of laser filamentation, the beam will quickly recollapse. This divergence and refocusing will continue indefinitely.

== In photo-reactive systems ==
Filament formation and propagation may also be observed in photopolymer systems. Such systems display a Kerr-like optical nonlinearity via photoreactive-based increases in the refractive index. The filaments form as a result of the self-trapping of individual beams, or modulation instability of a wide-area light profile. Filament propagation has been observed in several photo-polymerizable systems, including organo-siloxane, acrylics, epoxy and copolymers with epoxies, and polymer blends. The locations of filament formation and propagation may be controlled by modulating the spatial profile of the input light field. Such photo-reactive systems are able to produce filaments from spatially and temporally incoherent light, because the slow reaction responds to the time-average intensity of the optical field, whereby femto-second fluctuations wash out. This is similar to photo-refractive media with non-instantaneous responses, which enable filament propagation with incoherent or partially incoherent light.

== Potential applications ==
The filaments, having made a plasma, turn the narrowband laser pulse into a broadband pulse having a wholly new set of applications. An aspect of the filamentation induced plasma is the limited density of the electrons, a process which prevents the optical breakdown. This effect provides an source for spectroscopy of high pressure with low level of continuum and also smaller line broadening. Another potential application is the LIDAR-monitoring of air.

Flat panel dicing using short laser pulses is an important application due to the fact that as the glass substrates become thinner it becomes more difficult to improve the process yield using conventional diamond blade dicing techniques. Using short pulses dicing speeds of over 400 mm/s has been successfully demonstrated on non-alkali glass and borosilicate glass, using a 50 kHz, 5W high-power femtosecond laser. The working principle developed by Kamata et al. is the following. The short pulse laser beam having a wavelength to which the work is transparent is directed to the front surface of the work toward the back surface and focused. A filament in the light beam traveling direction from the beam waist is formed by the auto-focusing action due to the laser beam propagation in the work is formed. The substance in the filament is decomposed by the laser beam and can be discharged from the back surface, and a cavity is formed in the channel. While forming the cavity, the laser beam is scanned, a machined surface is formed, and thereafter the work can be cut with a weak bending stress.

In July 2014, researchers at the University of Maryland reported using filamenting femtosecond laser pulses in a square arrangement to produce a density gradient in air which acted as an optical waveguide lasting on the order of several milliseconds. Initial testing demonstrated a signal gain of 50% over an unguided signal at a distance of about one meter. A field application was demonstrated in 2021, where kHz-repetition-rate 1030-nm terawatt Yb:YAG laser, installed in the vicinity of the 124-m-tall Säntis telecommunications tower was used to guide lightning strikes towards the tower's Franklin rod, opening up the possibility of future laser lightning rods.
