= Optical communications repeater =

Device used to extend the reach of optical communications links

An optical communications repeater is used in a fiber-optic communications system to regenerate an optical signal. Such repeaters are used to extend the reach of optical communications links by overcoming loss due to attenuation of the optical fiber. Some repeaters also correct for distortion of the optical signal by converting it to an electrical signal, processing that electrical signal and then retransmitting an optical signal. Such repeaters are known as optical-electrical-optical (OEO) due to the conversion of the signal. These repeaters are also called regenerators for the same reason.

== Classification of regenerators ==
Optical regenerations are classified into 3 categories by the 3 R's scheme.

1. R : reamplification of the data pulse alone is carried out.
2. 2R : in addition to reamplification, pulse reshaping is carried out. E.g.: Mamyshev 2R regenerator.
3. 3R : in addition to reamplification and reshaping, retiming of data pulse is done.

== All-optical regenerators ==
An alternative method of regeneration is through all-optical regenerators without the additional requirement to convert back and forth between optical and electronic signals. Non-linear optical fibers allow the use of frequency shifting and frequency generation effects for regeneration. The key advantage of all-optical regeneration is the power efficiency provided by the device and simpler integration into an optical network.

== Optical amplifiers ==
Cost efficiency has led to OEO repeaters being largely replaced in long-haul systems by optical amplifiers since one (broadband) amplifier can be used for many wavelengths in a Wavelength Division Multiplexing (WDM) system. Note that this class of device is sometimes called "Optical Amplifier Repeater".

== Electronic vs optical regeneration ==
Due to the high data rates that can be achieved with optical systems, OEO repeaters are expensive to implement as electronics to handle those high data rates are expensive and difficult to construct. Also, since one repeater is required for each wavelength, and many tens of wavelengths may be transmitted down a single fiber, a lot of equipment is required for each fiber. Electrical repeaters are also limited in bandwidth and modulation format. In contrast, an optical amplifier can amplify all of the wavelengths in a single device and works for all modulation formats. An amplifier does not provide the regeneration ability of a repeater, but loss, rather than distortion is generally the limiting factor in the design of an optical communications system.
