= Self-focusing =

Non-linear optical process

Light passing through a gradient-index lens is focused as in a convex lens. In self-focusing, the refractive index gradient is induced by the light itself.

Self-focusing is a non-linear optical process induced by the change in refractive index of materials exposed to intense electromagnetic radiation. A medium whose refractive index increases with the electric field intensity acts as a focusing lens for an electromagnetic wave characterized by an initial transverse intensity gradient, as in a laser beam. The peak intensity of the self-focused region keeps increasing as the wave travels through the medium, until defocusing effects or medium damage interrupt this process. Self-focusing of light was discovered by Gurgen Askaryan.

Self-focusing is often observed when radiation generated by femtosecond lasers propagates through many solids, liquids and gases. Depending on the type of material and on the intensity of the radiation, several mechanisms produce variations in the refractive index which result in self-focusing: the main cases are Kerr-induced self-focusing and plasma self-focusing.

== Kerr-induced self-focusing ==
Kerr-induced self-focusing was first predicted in the 1960s and experimentally verified by studying the interaction of ruby lasers with glasses and liquids. Its origin lies in the optical Kerr effect, a non-linear process which arises in media exposed to intense electromagnetic radiation, and which produces a variation of the refractive index $n$ as described by the formula $n = n_0 + n_2 I$, where n_{0} and n_{2} are the linear and non-linear components of the refractive index, and I is the intensity of the radiation. Since n_{2} is positive in most materials, the refractive index becomes larger in the areas where the intensity is higher, usually at the centre of a beam, creating a focusing density profile which potentially leads to the collapse of a beam on itself. Self-focusing beams have been found to naturally evolve into a Townes profile regardless of their initial shape.

Self-focusing beyond a threshold of power can lead to laser collapse and damage to the medium, which occurs if the radiation power is greater than the critical power

$$P_{\text{cr}}= \alpha \frac{\lambda^2}{4 \pi n_0 n_2}$$,

where λ is the radiation wavelength in vacuum and α is a constant which depends on the initial spatial distribution of the beam. Although there is no general analytical expression for α, its value has been derived numerically for many beam profiles. The lower limit is α ≈ 1.86225, which corresponds to Townes beams, whereas for a Gaussian beam α ≈ 1.8962.

For air, n_{0} ≈ 1, n_{2} ≈ 4×10^{−23} m^{2}/W for λ = 800 nm, and the critical power is P_{cr} ≈ 2.4 GW, corresponding to an energy of about 0.3 mJ for a pulse duration of 100 fs. For silica, n_{0} ≈ 1.453, n_{2} ≈ 2.4×10^{−20} m^{2}/W, and the critical power is P_{cr} ≈ 2.8 MW.

Kerr-induced self-focusing is crucial for many applications in laser physics, both as a key ingredient and as a limiting factor. For example, the technique of chirped pulse amplification was developed to overcome the nonlinearities and damage of optical components that self-focusing would produce in the amplification of femtosecond laser pulses. On the other hand, self-focusing is a major mechanism behind Kerr-lens modelocking, laser filamentation in transparent media, self-compression of ultrashort laser pulses, parametric generation, and many areas of laser-matter interaction in general.

== Self-focusing and defocusing in gain medium ==
Kelley predicted that homogeneously broadened two-level atoms may focus or defocus light when carrier frequency $\omega$ is detuned downward or upward the center of gain line $\omega_0$. Laser pulse propagation with slowly varying envelope $E(\vec \mathbf{r},t)$ is governed in gain medium by the nonlinear Schrödinger-Frantz-Nodvik equation.

When $\omega$ is detuned downward or upward from $\omega_0$ the refractive index is changed. "Red" detuning leads to an increased index of refraction during saturation of the resonant transition, i.e. to self-focusing, while for "blue" detuning the radiation is defocused during saturation:

${\frac {\partial {{E}(\vec \mathbf{r},t)}} {\partial z} } + {\frac {1} {c} } {\frac {\partial {{E}(\vec \mathbf{r},t)}} {\partial t} } + {\frac {i} {2k} } \nabla_{\bot}^2 E (\vec \mathbf{r},t) =+ i k n_2 |E(\vec \mathbf{r},t)|^2 {{E}(\vec \mathbf{r},t)}+$

$\frac {\sigma N (\vec \mathbf{r},t)}{2} [1 + i ( \omega_0 - \omega )T_2] {{E}(\vec \mathbf{r},t)} , \nabla_{\bot}^2= {\frac {\partial^2}{{\partial x }^2}}+{\frac {\partial^2}{{\partial y }^2}},$

${\frac {\partial {{N}(\vec \mathbf{r},t)}} {\partial t} } = -{\frac {{{N_0}(\vec \mathbf{r})}} {T_1} }- \sigma (\omega) N (\vec \mathbf{r},t) |E(\vec \mathbf{r},t)|^2 ,$

where $\sigma (\omega)= \frac {\sigma_0}{1+T_2^2 ( \omega_0 - \omega )^2}$ is the stimulated emission cross section, ${N_0}(\vec \mathbf{r})$ is the population inversion density before pulse arrival, $T_1$ and $T_2$ are longitudinal and transverse lifetimes of two-level medium and $z$ is the propagation axis.

== Filamentation ==
The laser beam with a smooth spatial profile ${E}(\vec \mathbf{r},t)$ is affected by modulational instability. The small perturbations caused by roughnesses and medium defects are amplified in propagation. This effect is referred to as Bespalov-Talanov instability.

In a framework of nonlinear Schrödinger equation :

${\frac {\partial {{E}(\vec \mathbf{r},t)}} {\partial z} } + {\frac {1} {c} } {\frac {\partial {{E}(\vec \mathbf{r},t)}} {\partial t} } + {\frac {i} {2k} } \nabla_{\bot}^2 E (\vec \mathbf{r},t) =+ i k n_2 |E(\vec \mathbf{r},t)|^2 {{E}(\vec \mathbf{r},t)}$.

The rate of the perturbation growth or instability increment $h$ is linked with filament size $\kappa^{-1}$ via the equation $h^2=\kappa^2(n_2 |E(\vec \mathbf{r},t)|^2-\kappa^2/4k^2)$. Generalization of this link between Bespalov-Talanov increments and filament size in gain medium as a function of linear gain ${\sigma N (\vec \mathbf{r},t)}$ and detuning $\delta \omega=\omega_0 - \omega$ had been realized in.

== Plasma self-focusing ==
Advances in laser technology have recently enabled the observation of self-focusing in the interaction of intense laser pulses with plasmas. Self-focusing in plasma can occur through thermal, relativistic and ponderomotive effects. Thermal self-focusing is due to collisional heating of a plasma exposed to electromagnetic radiation: the rise in temperature induces a hydrodynamic expansion which leads to an increase of the index of refraction and further heating.

Relativistic self-focusing is caused by the mass increase of electrons travelling at speed approaching the speed of light, which modifies the plasma refractive index n_{rel} according to the equation

$$n_{rel} = \sqrt{1 - \frac{\omega_p^2}{\omega^2}}$$,

where ω is the radiation angular frequency and ω_{p} the relativistically corrected plasma frequency $\omega_p= \sqrt{\frac{n e^{2}}{\gamma m\epsilon_0}}$.

Ponderomotive self-focusing is caused by the ponderomotive force, which pushes electrons away from the region where the laser beam is more intense, therefore increasing the refractive index and inducing a focusing effect.

The evaluation of the contribution and interplay of these processes is a complex task, but a reference threshold for plasma self-focusing is the relativistic critical power

$$P_{cr}= \frac{m_e^2 c^5 \omega^2}{e^2 \omega_{p}^2} \simeq 17 \bigg(\frac{\omega}{\omega_{p}}\bigg)^2\ \textrm{GW}$$,

where m_{e} is the electron mass, c the speed of light, ω the radiation angular frequency, e the electron charge and ω_{p} the plasma frequency. For an electron density of 10^{19} cm^{−3} and radiation at the wavelength of 800 nm, the critical power is about 3 TW. Such values are realisable with modern lasers, which can exceed PW powers. For example, a laser delivering 50 fs pulses with an energy of 1 J has a peak power of 20 TW.

Self-focusing in a plasma can balance the natural diffraction and channel a laser beam. Such effect is beneficial for many applications, since it helps increasing the length of the interaction between laser and medium. This is crucial, for example, in laser-driven particle acceleration, laser-fusion schemes and high harmonic generation.

== Accumulated self-focusing ==
Self-focusing can be induced by a permanent refractive index change resulting from a multi-pulse exposure. This effect has been observed in glasses which increase the refractive index during an exposure to ultraviolet laser radiation. Accumulated self-focusing develops as a wave guiding, rather than a lensing effect. The scale of actively forming beam filaments is a function of the exposure dose. Evolution of each beam filament towards a singularity is limited by the maximum induced refractive index change or by laser damage resistance of the glass.

== Self-focusing in soft matter and polymer systems ==
Self-focusing can also been observed in a number of soft matter systems, such as solutions of polymers and particles as well as photo-polymers. Self-focusing was observed in photo-polymer systems with microscale laser beams of either UV or visible light. The self-trapping of incoherent light was also later observed. Self-focusing can also be observed in wide-area beams, wherein the beam undergoes filamentation, or modulation instability, spontaneous dividing into a multitude of microscale self-focused beams, or filaments. The balance of self-focusing and natural beam divergence results in the beams propagating divergence-free. Self-focusing in photopolymerizable media is possible, owing to a photoreaction dependent refractive index, and the fact that refractive index in polymers is proportional to molecular weight and crosslinking degree which increases over the duration of photo-polymerization.

== See also ==
- Filament propagation

== Bibliography ==
- Carrigan, Richard A.; Ellison, James A., eds. (1987). Relativistic Channeling. NATO ASI Series. Vol. 165. doi:10.1007/978-1-4757-6394-2. ISBN 978-1-4419-3207-5.
