= Matvei Rabinovich =

Russian plasma physicist

Matvei (or Matvey) Samsonovich Rabinovich (Russian:Матвей Самсонович Рабинович) (20 February 1919 - 20 May 1982) was a Soviet plasma physicist and mathematician.

He was born in Kazan, Tatarstan. After he had completed his schooling, he worked in a metal plant for a few years.

In 1941, he graduated from the Physics faculty of Moscow State University. After seeking the advice of a senior fellow (and eventual Nobel laureate), Vitaly Ginzburg, he was persuaded by Ginzburg to apply for a postgraduate course at FIAN (the Lebedev Physical Institute of the Soviet Academy of Sciences (LPI)). Rabinovich became a postgraduate student of Evgenii Feinberg and a junior researcher in the LPI from 1945, once Ginzburg had changed Feinberg's mind about accepting him; this arrangement notwithstanding, Feinberg told Rabinovich not even to call him.

From 1948, he was a senior researcher in Vladimir Veksler's laboratory (and he later wrote his epitaph in the scientific press). That year he also gained a Ph.D. in Physical and Mathematical Sciences. From the early 1950s, he was established as a leading Soviet expert in accelerator theory and, along with Veksler, received state prizes for his work. In particular, he supported research on stellarators. In 1957, he started the LPI's Laboratory for Fusion and Plasma Physics. In 1959, he was granted a professorship at the LPI. He founded the journal Fizika Plasmy (Plasma Physics).

He remained in his role as the head of the laboratory for the remainder of his life. He died in Moscow aged 63 after a long illness.

== Awards ==
- 1951: Stalin Prize.
- 1959: Lenin Prize.
