= Photoelectrochemical process =

Electrochemical processes involving photons and the emission or absorption of light

Photoelectrochemical processes are processes in photoelectrochemistry; they usually involve transforming light into other forms of energy. These processes apply to photochemistry, optically pumped lasers, sensitized solar cells, luminescence, and photochromism.

== Electron excitation ==
After absorbing energy, an electron may jump from the ground state to a higher energy excited state.

Electron excitation is the movement of an electron to a higher energy state. This can either be done by photoexcitation (PE), where the original electron absorbs the photon and gains all the photon's energy or by electrical excitation (EE), where the original electron absorbs the energy of another, energetic electron. Within a semiconductor crystal lattice, thermal excitation is a process where lattice vibrations provide enough energy to move electrons to a higher energy band. When an excited electron falls back to a lower energy state again, it is called electron relaxation. This can be done by radiation of a photon or giving the energy to a third spectator particle as well.

In physics there is a specific technical definition for energy level which is often associated with an atom being excited to an excited state. The excited state, in general, is in relation to the ground state, where the excited state is at a higher energy level than the ground state.

== Photoexcitation ==
Photoexcitation is the mechanism of electron excitation by photon absorption, when the energy of the photon is too low to cause photoionization. The absorption of the photon takes place in accordance with Planck's quantum theory.

Photoexcitation plays role in photoisomerization. Photoexcitation is exploited in dye-sensitized solar cells, photochemistry, luminescence, optically pumped lasers, and in some photochromic applications.

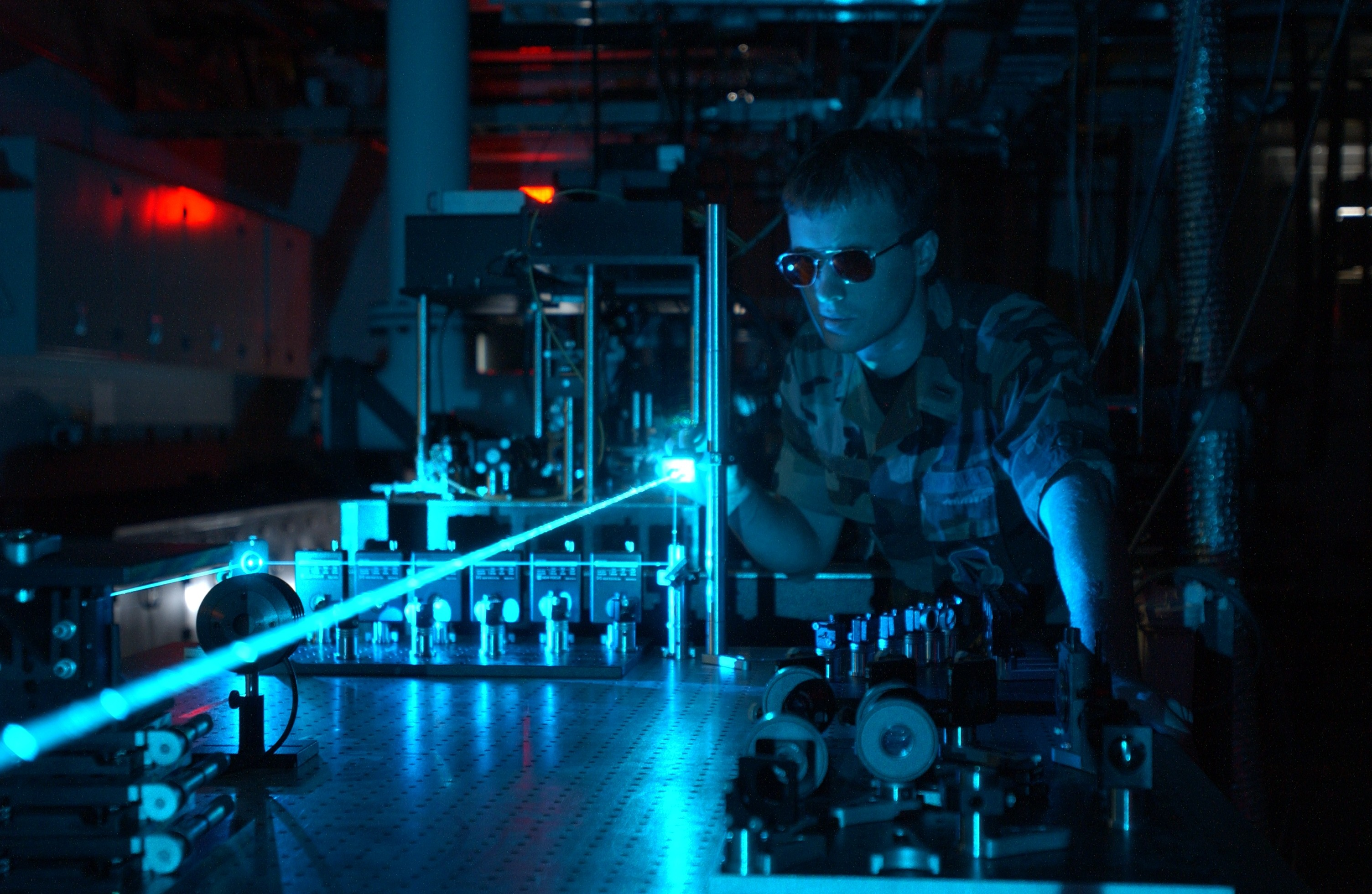
Military laser experiment

== Photoisomerization ==
Photoisomerization of azobenzene

In chemistry, photoisomerization is molecular behavior in which structural change between isomers is caused by photoexcitation. Both reversible and irreversible photoisomerization reactions exist. However, the word "photoisomerization" usually indicates a reversible process. Photoisomerizable molecules are already put to practical use, for instance, in pigments for rewritable CDs, DVDs, and 3D optical data storage solutions. In addition, recent interest in photoisomerizable molecules has been aimed at molecular devices, such as molecular switches, molecular motors, and molecular electronics.

Photoisomerization behavior can be roughly categorized into several classes. Two major classes are trans-cis (or 'E-'Z) conversion, and open-closed ring transition. Examples of the former include stilbene and azobenzene. This type of compounds has a double bond, and rotation or inversion around the double bond affords isomerization between the two states. Examples of the latter include fulgide and diarylethene. This type of compounds undergoes bond cleavage and bond creation upon irradiation with particular wavelengths of light. Still another class is the di-π-methane rearrangement.

== Photoionization ==
Photoionization is the physical process in which an incident photon ejects one or more electrons from an atom, ion or molecule. This is essentially the same process that occurs with the photoelectric effect with metals. In the case of a gas or single atoms, the term photoionization is more common.

The ejected electrons, known as photoelectrons, carry information about their pre-ionized states. For example, a single electron can have a kinetic energy equal to the energy of the incident photon minus the electron binding energy of the state it left. Photons with energies less than the electron binding energy may be absorbed or scattered but will not photoionize the atom or ion.

For example, to ionize hydrogen, photons need an energy greater than 13.6 electronvolts (the Rydberg energy), which corresponds to a wavelength of 91.2 nm. For photons with greater energy than this, the energy of the emitted photoelectron is given by:

$${ mv^2 \over 2 } = h \nu - 13.6 eV$$

where h is the Planck constant and ν is the frequency of the photon.

This formula defines the photoelectric effect.

Not every photon which encounters an atom or ion will photoionize it. The probability of photoionization is related to the photoionization cross-section, which depends on the energy of the photon and the target being considered. For photon energies below the ionization threshold, the photoionization cross-section is near zero. But with the development of pulsed lasers it has become possible to create extremely intense, coherent light where multi-photon ionization may occur. At even higher intensities (around 10^{15} - 10^{16} W/cm^{2} of infrared or visible light), non-perturbative phenomena such as barrier suppression ionization and rescattering ionization are observed.

=== Multi-photon ionization ===
Several photons of energy below the ionization threshold may actually combine their energies to ionize an atom. This probability decreases rapidly with the number of photons required, but the development of very intense, pulsed lasers still makes it possible. In the perturbative regime (below about 10^{14} W/cm^{2} at optical frequencies), the probability of absorbing N photons depends on the laser-light intensity I as I^{N}.

Above threshold ionization (ATI) is an extension of multi-photon ionization where even more photons are absorbed than actually would be necessary to ionize the atom. The excess energy gives the released electron higher kinetic energy than the usual case of just-above threshold ionization. More precisely, the system will have multiple peaks in its photoelectron spectrum which are separated by the photon energies, this indicates that the emitted electron has more kinetic energy than in the normal (lowest possible number of photons) ionization case. The electrons released from the target will have approximately an integer number of photon-energies more kinetic energy. In intensity regions between 10^{14} W/cm^{2} and 10^{18} W/cm^{2}, each of MPI, ATI, and barrier suppression ionization can occur simultaneously, each contributing to the overall ionization of the atoms involved.

== Photo–Dember effect ==
In semiconductor physics the Photo–Dember effect (named after its discoverer H. Dember) consists in the formation of a charge dipole in the vicinity of a semiconductor surface after ultra-fast photo-generation of charge carriers. The dipole forms owing to the difference of mobilities (or diffusion constants) for holes and electrons which combined with the break of symmetry provided by the surface lead to an effective charge separation in the direction perpendicular to the surface.

== Grotthuss–Draper law ==
The Grotthuss–Draper law (also called the principle of photochemical activation) states that only that light which is absorbed by a system can bring about a photochemical change. Materials such as dyes and phosphors must be able to absorb "light" at optical frequencies. This law provides a basis for fluorescence and phosphorescence. The law was first proposed in 1817 by Theodor Grotthuss and in 1842, independently, by John William Draper.

This is considered to be one of the two basic laws of photochemistry. The second law is the Stark–Einstein law, which says that primary chemical or physical reactions occur with each photon absorbed.

== Stark–Einstein law ==
The Stark–Einstein law is named after German-born physicists Johannes Stark and Albert Einstein, who independently formulated the law between 1908 and 1913. It is also known as the photochemical equivalence law or photoequivalence law. In essence it says that every photon that is absorbed will cause a (primary) chemical or physical reaction.

The photon is a quantum of radiation, or one unit of radiation. Therefore, this is a single unit of EM radiation that is equal to the Planck constant (h) times the frequency of light. This quantity is symbolized by γ, hν, or ħω.

The photochemical equivalence law is also restated as follows: for every mole of a substance that reacts, an equivalent mole of quanta of light are absorbed. The formula is:

$$\Delta E_\text{mol} = N_\text{A} h \nu$$

where N_{A} is the Avogadro constant.

The photochemical equivalence law applies to the part of a light-induced reaction that is referred to as the primary process (i.e. absorption or fluorescence).

In most photochemical reactions the primary process is usually followed by so-called secondary photochemical processes that are normal interactions between reactants not requiring absorption of light. As a result, such reactions do not appear to obey the one quantum–one molecule reactant relationship.

The law is further restricted to conventional photochemical processes using light sources with moderate intensities; high-intensity light sources such as those used in flash photolysis and in laser experiments are known to cause so-called biphotonic processes; i.e., the absorption by a molecule of a substance of two photons of light.

== Absorption ==
In physics, absorption of electromagnetic radiation is the way by which the energy of a photon is taken up by matter, typically the electrons of an atom. Thus, the electromagnetic energy is transformed to other forms of energy, for example, to heat. The absorption of light during wave propagation is often called attenuation. Usually, the absorption of waves does not depend on their intensity (linear absorption), although in certain conditions (usually, in optics), the medium changes its transparency dependently on the intensity of waves going through, and the Saturable absorption (or nonlinear absorption) occurs.

== Photosensitization ==
Photosensitization is a process of transferring the energy of absorbed light. After absorption, the energy is transferred to the (chosen) reactants. This is part of the work of photochemistry in general. In particular this process is commonly employed where reactions require light sources of certain wavelengths that are not readily available.

For example, mercury absorbs radiation at 1849 and 2537 angstroms, and the source is often high-intensity mercury lamps. It is a commonly used sensitizer. When mercury vapor is mixed with ethylene, and the compound is irradiated with a mercury lamp, this results in the photodecomposition of ethylene to acetylene. This occurs on absorption of light to yield excited state mercury atoms, which are able to transfer this energy to the ethylene molecules, and are in turn deactivated to their initial energy state.

Cadmium; some of the noble gases, for example xenon; zinc; benzophenone; and a large number of organic dyes, are also used as sensitizers.

Photosensitisers are a key component of photodynamic therapy used to treat cancers.

== Sensitizer ==
A sensitizer in chemiluminescence is a chemical compound, capable of light emission after it has received energy from a molecule, which became excited previously in the chemical reaction. A good example is this:

When an alkaline solution of sodium hypochlorite and a concentrated solution of hydrogen peroxide are mixed, a reaction occurs:

ClO^{−}(aq) + H_{2}O_{2}(aq) → O_{2}*(g) + H^{+}(aq) + Cl^{−}(aq) + OH^{−}(aq)

O_{2}*is excited oxygen – meaning, one or more electrons in the O_{2} molecule have been promoted to higher-energy molecular orbitals. Hence, oxygen produced by this chemical reaction somehow 'absorbed' the energy released by the reaction and became excited. This energy state is unstable, therefore it will return to the ground state by lowering its energy. It can do that in more than one way:

- it can react further, without any light emission
- it can lose energy without emission, for example, giving off heat to the surroundings or transferring energy to another molecule
- it can emit light

The intensity, duration and color of emitted light depend on quantum and kinetical factors. However, excited molecules are frequently less capable of light emission in terms of brightness and duration when compared to sensitizers. This is because sensitizers can store energy (that is, be excited) for longer periods of time than other excited molecules. The energy is stored through means of quantum vibration, so sensitizers are usually compounds which either include systems of aromatic rings or many conjugated double and triple bonds in their structure. Hence, if an excited molecule transfers its energy to a sensitizer thus exciting it, longer and easier to quantify light emission is often observed.

The color (that is, the wavelength), brightness and duration of emission depend upon the sensitizer used. Usually, for a certain chemical reaction, many different sensitizers can be used.

=== List of some common sensitizers ===
- Violanthrone
- Isoviolanthrone
- Fluorescein
- Rubrene
- 9,10-Diphenylanthracene
- Tetracene
- 13,13'-Dibenzantronile
- Levulinic Acid

== Fluorescence spectroscopy ==
Fluorescence spectroscopy aka fluorometry or spectrofluorometry, is a type of electromagnetic spectroscopy which analyzes fluorescence from a sample. It involves using a beam of light, usually ultraviolet light, that excites the electrons in molecules of certain compounds and causes them to emit light of a lower energy, typically, but not necessarily, visible light. A complementary technique is absorption spectroscopy.

Devices that measure fluorescence are called fluorometers or fluorimeters.

== Absorption spectroscopy ==
Absorption spectroscopy refers to spectroscopic techniques that measure the absorption of radiation, as a function of frequency or wavelength, due to its interaction with a sample. The sample absorbs energy, i.e., photons, from the radiating field. The intensity of the absorption varies as a function of frequency, and this variation is the absorption spectrum. Absorption spectroscopy is performed across the electromagnetic spectrum.

== See also ==
- Photoelectrochemistry
- Ionization energy
- Isomerization
- Photoionization mode
- Photochromism
- Photoelectric effect
- Photoionization detector
