= Kerr effect =

Change in refractive index of a material in response to an applied electric field

The Kerr effect, also called the quadratic electro-optic (QEO) effect, is a change in the refractive index of a material in response to an applied electric field. The Kerr effect is distinct from the Pockels effect in that the induced index change for the Kerr effect is directly proportional to the square of the electric field instead of varying linearly with it. All materials show a Kerr effect, but certain liquids display it more strongly than others. The Kerr effect was discovered in 1875 by Scottish physicist John Kerr.

Two special cases of the Kerr effect are normally considered, these being the Kerr electro-optic effect, or DC Kerr effect, and the optical Kerr effect, or AC Kerr effect.

== Kerr electro-optic effect ==
The Kerr electro-optic effect, or DC Kerr effect, is the special case in which a slowly varying external electric field is applied by, for instance, a voltage on electrodes across the sample material. Under this influence, the sample becomes birefringent, with different indices of refraction for light polarized parallel to or perpendicular to the applied field. The difference in index of refraction, Δn, is given by

$$\Delta n = \lambda K E^2,\$$

where λ is the wavelength of the light, K is the Kerr constant, and E is the strength of the electric field. This difference in index of refraction causes the material to act like a waveplate when light is incident on it in a direction perpendicular to the electric field. If the material is placed between two "crossed" (perpendicular) linear polarizers, no light will be transmitted when the electric field is turned off, while nearly all of the light will be transmitted for some optimum value of the electric field. Higher values of the Kerr constant allow complete transmission to be achieved with a smaller applied electric field.

Some polar liquids, such as nitrotoluene (C_{7}H_{7}NO_{2}) and nitrobenzene (C_{6}H_{5}NO_{2}) exhibit very large Kerr constants. A glass cell filled with one of these liquids is called a Kerr cell. These are frequently used to modulate light, since the Kerr effect responds very quickly to changes in electric field. Light can be modulated with these devices at frequencies as high as 10 GHz. Because the Kerr effect is relatively weak, a typical Kerr cell may require voltages as high as 30 kV to achieve complete transparency. This is in contrast to Pockels cells, which can operate at much lower voltages. Another disadvantage of Kerr cells is that the best available material, nitrobenzene, is poisonous. Some transparent crystals have also been used for Kerr modulation, although they have smaller Kerr constants.

In media that lack inversion symmetry, the Kerr effect is generally masked by the much stronger Pockels effect. The Kerr effect is still present, however, and in many cases can be detected independently of Pockels effect contributions.

== Optical Kerr effect ==
The optical Kerr effect, or AC Kerr effect is the case in which the electric field is due to the light itself. This causes a variation in index of refraction that is proportional to the light's local irradiance. This refractive index variation is responsible for the nonlinear optical effects of self-focusing, self-phase modulation and modulational instability, and is the basis for Kerr-lens modelocking. This effect only becomes significant with intense beams such as those from lasers. The optical Kerr effect can dynamically alter the mode-coupling properties in multimode fiber, a technique that has potential applications for all-optical switching mechanisms, nanophotonic systems and low-dimensional photo-sensor devices.

== Magneto-optic Kerr effect ==
The magneto-optic Kerr effect (MOKE) is the phenomenon that the light reflected from a magnetized material has a slightly rotated plane of polarization. It is similar to the Faraday effect where the plane of polarization of the transmitted light is rotated.

== Theory ==
=== DC Kerr effect ===
For a nonlinear material, the electric polarization $\mathbf{P}$ will depend on the electric field $\mathbf{E}$:

$$\mathbf{P} = \varepsilon_0 \chi^{(1)}\mathbf{E} + \varepsilon_0 \chi^{(2)}\mathbf{E E} + \varepsilon_0 \chi^{(3)}\mathbf{E E E} + \cdots$$

where $\varepsilon_0$ is the vacuum permittivity and $\chi^{(n)}$ is the $n$-th order component of the electric susceptibility of the medium. We can write that relationship explicitly; the i-th component for the vector P can be expressed as:

$$P_i =
\varepsilon_0 \sum_{j=1}^{3} \chi^{(1)}_{i j} E_j +
\varepsilon_0 \sum_{j=1}^{3} \sum_{k=1}^{3} \chi^{(2)}_{i j k} E_j E_k +
\varepsilon_0 \sum_{j=1}^{3} \sum_{k=1}^{3} \sum_{l=1}^{3} \chi^{(3)}_{i j k l} E_j E_k E_l + \cdots$$

where $i,j,k... = 1,2,3$. It is often assumed that $P_1$ ∥ $P_x$, i.e., the component parallel to x of the polarization field; $E_2$ ∥ $E_y$ and so on.

For a linear medium, only the first term of this equation is significant and the polarization varies linearly with the electric field.

For materials exhibiting a non-negligible Kerr effect, the third, χ^{(3)} term is significant, with the even-order terms typically dropping out due to inversion symmetry of the Kerr medium. Consider the net electric field E produced by a light wave of frequency ω together with an external electric field E_{0}:

$$\mathbf{E} = \mathbf{E}_0 + \mathbf{E}_\omega \cos(\omega t),$$

where E_{ω} is the vector amplitude of the wave.

Combining these two equations produces a complex expression for P. For the DC Kerr effect, we can neglect all except the linear terms and those in $\chi^{(3)}|\mathbf{E}_0|^2 \mathbf{E}_\omega$:

$$\mathbf{P} \simeq \varepsilon_0  \left( \chi^{(1)} + 3 \chi^{(3)} |\mathbf{E}_0|^2 \right) \mathbf{E}_\omega \cos(\omega
t),$$

which is similar to the linear relationship between polarization and an electric field of a wave, with an additional non-linear susceptibility term proportional to the square of the amplitude of the external field.

For centrosymmetric media (e.g. liquids), this induced change of susceptibility produces a change in refractive index in the direction of the electric field compared with the refractive index $n_\perp$ in the direction perpendicular to the electric field:

$$\Delta n = n_{\parallel} - n_{\perp} = \lambda_0 K |\mathbf{E}_0|^2,$$

where $n_{\parallel}$ is the refractive index of the medium in the direction of the electric field, λ_{0} is the vacuum wavelength and K is the Kerr constant for the medium. Consequently, the applied field induces a birefringence $\Delta n$ in the medium in the direction of the field. A Kerr cell with a transverse field can thus act as a switchable wave plate, rotating the plane of polarization of a wave travelling through it. In combination with polarizers, it can be used as a shutter or modulator.

The values of K depend on the medium and are about 9.4×10^{−14} m·V^{−2} for water, and 4.4×10^{−12} m·V^{−2} for nitrobenzene.

For crystals, the susceptibility of the medium will in general be a tensor, and the Kerr effect produces a modification of this tensor.

=== AC Kerr effect ===
In the optical or AC Kerr effect, an intense beam of light in a medium can itself provide the modulating electric field, without the need for an external field to be applied. In this case, the electric field is given by:

$$\mathbf{E} = \mathbf{E}_\omega \cos(\omega t),$$

where E_{ω} is the amplitude of the wave as before.

Combining this with the equation for the polarization, and taking only linear terms and those in χ^{(3)}|E_{ω}|^{3}:

$$\mathbf{P} \simeq \varepsilon_0  \left( \chi^{(1)} + \frac{3}{4} \chi^{(3)} |\mathbf{E}_\omega|^2 \right) \mathbf{E}_\omega \cos(\omega t).$$

As before, this looks like a linear susceptibility with an additional non-linear term:

$$\chi = \chi_{\mathrm{LIN}} + \chi_{\mathrm{NL}} = \chi^{(1)} + \frac{3\chi^{(3)}}{4} |\mathbf{E}_\omega|^2,$$

and since:

$$n = (1 + \chi)^{1/2} =
\left( 1+\chi_{\mathrm{LIN}} + \chi_{\mathrm{NL}} \right)^{1/2}
\simeq n_0 \left( 1 + \frac{1}{2 {n_0}^2} \chi_{\mathrm{NL}} \right)$$

where n_{0}=(1+χ_{LIN})^{1/2} is the linear refractive index. Using a Taylor expansion since χ_{NL} ≪ n_{0}^{2}, this gives an intensity dependent refractive index (IDRI) of:

$$n = n_0 + \frac{3\chi^{(3)}}{8 n_0} |\mathbf{E}_{\omega}|^2 = n_0 + n_2 I$$

where n_{2} is the second-order nonlinear refractive index, and I is the intensity of the wave. The refractive index change is thus proportional to the intensity of the light travelling through the medium.

The values of n_{2} are relatively small for most materials, on the order of 10^{−20} m^{2} W^{−1} for typical glasses. Therefore, beam intensities (irradiances) on the order of 1 GW cm^{−2} (such as those produced by lasers) are necessary to produce significant variations in refractive index via the AC Kerr effect.

The optical Kerr effect manifests itself temporally as self-phase modulation, a self-induced phase- and frequency-shift of a pulse of light as it travels through a medium. This process, along with dispersion, can produce optical solitons.

Spatially, an intense beam of light in a medium will produce a change in the medium's refractive index that mimics the transverse intensity pattern of the beam. For example, a Gaussian beam results in a Gaussian refractive index profile, similar to that of a gradient-index lens. This causes the beam to focus itself, a phenomenon known as self-focusing.

As the beam self-focuses, the peak intensity increases which, in turn, causes more self-focusing to occur. The beam is prevented from self-focusing indefinitely by nonlinear effects such as multiphoton ionization, which become important when the intensity becomes very high. As the intensity of the self-focused spot increases beyond a certain value, the medium is ionized by the high local optical field. This lowers the refractive index, defocusing the propagating light beam. Propagation then proceeds in a series of repeated focusing and defocusing steps.

== See also ==
- Jeffree cell, an early acousto-optic modulator
- Filament propagation
- Rapatronic camera, which used a Kerr cell to take sub-millisecond photographs of nuclear explosions
- Optical heterodyne detection
- Zeeman effect
