= Filling factor =

Filling factor, $~F,~$ is a quantity measuring the efficiency of absorption of pump in the core of a double-clad fiber.

== Definition ==
Estimates of the pump efficiency in a double-clad fiber with $F=0.8$ (blue) and $F=0.9$ (red), discussed in compared to the results of the ray tracing simulations(black curves).

The efficiency of absorption of pumping energy in the fiber is an important parameter of a double-clad fiber laser. In many cases this efficiency can be approximated with

$$1- \exp\left(  - F \frac{\pi r^2}{S}\alpha L \right) ,$$

where

$~S~$ is the cross-sectional area of the cladding
$~r~$ is the radius of the core (which is taken to be circular)
$~\alpha~$ is the absorption coefficient of pump light in the core
$~L~$ is the length of the double-clad fiber, and
$~F~$ is a dimensionless adjusting parameter, which is sometimes called the "filling factor"; $~0<F<1~$.

The filling factor may depend on the initial distribution of the pump light, the shape of the cladding, and the position of the core within it.

== Application ==
The large (close to unity) filling factor is important in double-clad amplifiers; it allows them to reduce the requirements for the brightness of the pump and to reduce the length of the fiber laser. Such a reduction is especially important for the power scaling of various nonlinear processes, and contributions of stimulated scattering to the degradation of signal. Use of the filling factor for the estimate of the efficiency of absorption of the pump in fiber lasers allows quick estimates without performing complicated numerical simulations.

== See also ==
- Double-clad fiber
- Erbium Doped Fibre Amplifier (EDFA)
