= Coupling parameter =

The coupling parameter of the resonator specifies the part of the energy of the laser field, which is output at each round-trip. The coupling parameter should not be confused with the round-trip loss, which refers to the part of the energy which is absorbed or scattered at each round-trip of laser field in the laser resonator, and cannot be used.

At the continuous wave operation, the round-trip gain is determined by the coupling parameter and the round-trip loss. In simple configurations of the laser cavity or laser resonator, the coupling parameter may be just the transmission coefficient of the output coupler or just square of the magnification coefficient in the case of an unstable resonator.

The round-trip loss may limit the power scaling of the active mirrors, or disk lasers, while the size of the gain medium scales up, and the gain size product is limited by the exponential growth of the amplified spontaneous emission; the powerful disk laser should work at low values of the coupling parameter and even lower values of the round-trip loss.
