= EDWA (disambiguation) =

EDWA is an abbreviation for erbium-doped waveguide amplifier. EDWA may also refer to:

- E.D.Wa., the United States District Court for the Eastern District of Washington
- Former acronym of the Department of Education and Training Western Australia, in RM Education
