= David N. Payne =

British professor (born 1944)

Professor David Payne CBE FRS FREng
- Born: 13 August 1944 (age 82); United Kingdom
- Education: University of Southampton
- Known for: Opto-electronics; Erbium-Doped Fiber Amplifier
- Awards: FRS (1992); FREng (2005); IET Mountbatten Medal (2001); Marconi Prize (2008)
- Scientific career
- Fields: Opto-electronics
- Workplaces: University of Southampton, UK
- Website: www.orc.soton.ac.uk/people/dnp

David Neil Payne (born 13 August 1944) is a British professor of photonics who is director of the Optoelectronics Research Centre at the University of Southampton. He has made several contributions in areas of optical fibre communications over the last fifty years and his work has affected telecommunications and laser technology. Payne’s work spans diverse areas of photonics, from telecommunications and optical sensors to nanophotonics and optical materials, including the introduction of the first optical fibre drawing tower in a university.

== Career ==
Payne’s work in fibre fabrication in the 1970s resulted in many of the special fibres used today. He was part of the team at Southampton that invented the erbium-doped fibre amplifier, a type of optical amplifier. Although the idea was conceived and performed by Robert Mears. The idea was adopted at Bell Laboratories in New Jersey, USA and the two teams between them developed much of the EDFA technology we know today. The EDFA was a crucial component that fuelled the rapid growth in the internet through its ability to transmit and amplify large amounts of data.

Payne also pioneered fibre lasers and led the teams that invented the single mode silica fibre laser and amplifier and broke the kilowatt barrier for the output of a fibre laser. Since then he has made discoveries which have contributed to the growth of fibre lasers for use in manufacturing and defence.

Payne is the current director of the Optoelectronics Research Centre at the University of Southampton, one of the world’s largest research groups dedicated to photonics. He also directs the Photonics Hyperhighway research project, aimed at making internet connections 100 times faster.

== Awards and recognition ==
He has received the UK Rank Prize for Optics, the US Tyndall Award (1991) and the Benjamin Franklin Medal for Engineering (1998). He is also an Eduard Rhein Foundation Laureate (Germany). In 2001, Payne was awarded the Mountbatten Medal of the IEE (2001) and the Kelvin Medal of the eight major engineering institutions for distinction in the application of science to engineering (2004). The Institute of Electrical and Electronics Engineers (IEEE) awarded him the 2007 Photonics Award for outstanding achievements in photonics, the first awarded outside the USA. In 2008, he won the $100,000 Marconi Prize for his work in developing the erbium-doped optical fibre amplifier. In 2011, the Marconi Society elected him Chairman. He was appointed a Fellow of the Royal Academy of Engineering in 2005. In 2007, he was elected to the Russian Academy of Sciences as one of only 240 foreign members. Payne was knighted in the 2013 New Year Honours for services to photonics research and applications.

In 2022, Payne was awarded the VinFuture Grand Prize, valued at US $3 million shared with 4 others, for his development of optical fiber communication over five decades related to fiber design, optical amplifiers, specialty fibers, and high-powered lasers and amplifiers that made Internet transmission possible on a global scale, thanks to the ability to boost high-speed optical signals repeatedly.
