= Robert J. Mears =

English physicist and engineer

- Born: England
- Occupations: Physicist and engineer
- Known for: Invented EDFA, founded Atomera.
- Notable work: EDFA, Mears Silicon Technology

Robert J. Mears is an English physicist and engineer. In the 1980s, Dr. Mears invented and demonstrated the Erbium Doped Fiber Amplifier (EDFA) with the help of members of the Optoelectronics Research Group led by Alec Gambling and David Payne. In 2001 he founded Atomera, and as CTO led the invention and development of Mears Silicon Technology (MST), a method for improving the mobility and other characteristics of semiconductor devices. Mears has authored and co-authored more than 250 publications and patents, and is co-inventor of 46 granted US patents. He is an Emeritus Fellow of Pembroke College, Cambridge.

== Education ==
Mears graduated with a BA(1982), MA(1986) in physics from Oxford University. In 1982, he moved to Southampton University to study for his PhD. There he conceived and demonstrated the first EDFA and various fibre lasers. Mears was awarded the PhD degree in 1987 for his thesis entitled “Development of rare-earth doped fibre lasers and amplifiers”. He was elected to the Maudslay Research Fellowship at Pembroke College, Cambridge in May 1987 and the following year was elected to the faculty of Cambridge University Engineering Department, later being appointed Reader in Photonics. He founded Atomera (formerly known as Mears Technologies) in 2001. He remains an Emeritus Fellow of Pembroke College, Cambridge.

== EDFA ==
In 1986 and 1987, Mears co-authored two papers published in the Institute of Electrical Engineers (IEE) Journal “Electronics Letters” entitled "Low-threshold tunable CW and Q-switched fiber laser operating at 1.55μm" and “Low-noise Erbium-doped fibre amplifier at 1.54μm”. These two papers are the first on gain in erbium-doped single mode fibers and the EDFA (Erbium-Doped Fibre Amplifier). Dr. Mears was a co-recipient of the 1986 IEE Electronics Letters Premium. Before these works were published, patents covering the fabrication of the fiber and the laser and amplifier were filed on the UK and US. The Book Patents, Inventions and the Dynamics of Innovation: A Multidisciplinary Study describes Dr. Mears invention as a “seminal invention”.

== Atomera ==
In 2001, Mears founded the semiconductor company, Mears Technologies, which was later renamed Atomera. The firm developed the MST platform, a way to make silicon transistors to be more efficient without shrinking the manufacturing process. This is achieved by inserting oxygen layers during silicon epitaxy of the channel layer.
