= Tapered double-clad fiber =

Type of optical fiber

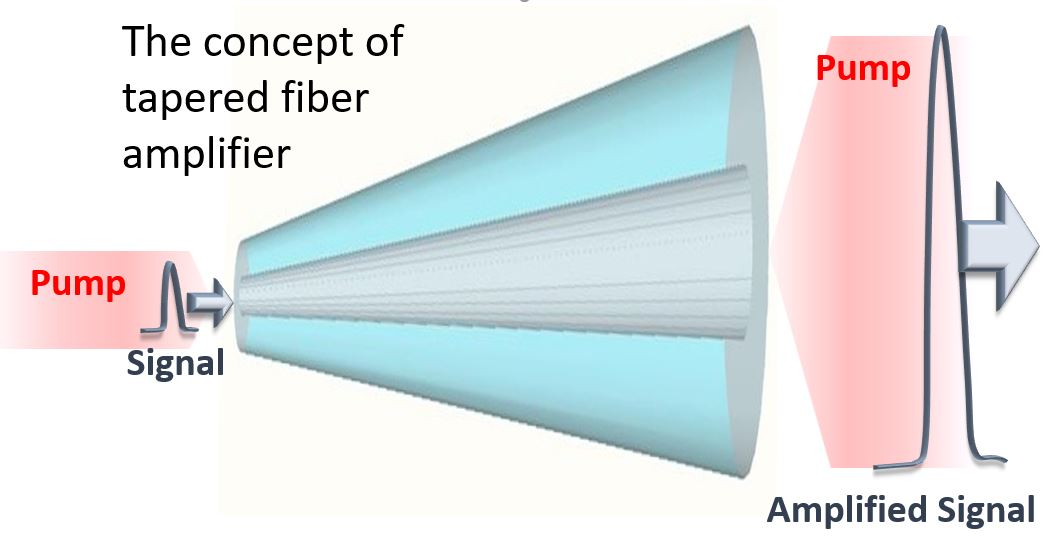
Tapered double-clad fiber

A tapered double-clad fiber (T-DCF) is a double-clad optical fiber which is formed using a specialised fiber drawing process, in which temperature and pulling forces are controlled to form a taper along the length of the fiber. By using pre-clad fiber preforms both the fiber core and the inner and outer cladding layers vary in diameter and thickness along the full length of the fiber. This tapering of the fiber enables the combination of the characteristics of conventional 8–10 μm diameter double-clad single-mode fibers to propagate light in fundamental mode with those of larger diameter (50–100 μm) double-clad multi-mode fibers used for optical amplification and lasing. The result is improved maintenance of pulse fidelity compared to conventional consistent diameter fiber amplifiers. By virtue of the large cladding diameter T-DCF can be pumped by optical sources with very poor brightness factor such as laser diode bars or even VECSELs matrices, significantly reducing the cost of fiber lasers/amplifiers.

== History ==
The T-DCF amplifier was first conceived and demonstrated at Tampere University in the research group of Professor Oleg Okhotnikov in 2008. The technology was granted a patent in 2013 as a means to overcome the nonlinear optical effects which previously limited the power-scaling of fiber lasers and fiber amplifiers.

== Technical characteristics and applications ==
=== Reduced non-linear effect distortion in fiber amplification ===
Increasing the diameter of a cylindrical optical fiber amplifiers generally increases the level of non-linear effects such as stimulated Brillouin scattering. The result of forming a tapered geometry double-clad fiber is that the light introduced into the thin end propagates in a wide core without changing the mode content. Consequently, the use of T-DCF for optical amplification in a multi-mode fiber maintains good beam quality by elevating the thresholds of stimulation of non-linear effects including Brillouin and Raman scattering and spontaneous emission. Using tapered fiber with thick end core diameters of up to 200 μm with a 0.11 numerical aperture and record peak power and energy amplification levels 60 ps pulses with 300 μJ energy free of non-linear distortions have been reported.

=== High absorption of pump light ===
The double-clad structure of the fiber means the core can be pumped with higher-power than could be propagated in the fiber. The absorption and conversion of pump light per unit length is increased in the tapered fiber compared to cylindrical fibers with similar levels of active ion doping. This is due to the improved clad mode mixing and the higher absorption at the thicker end of the taper due to the much thicker cladding which also means the rare earth ion dopants are beneficially concentrated at the wide end of a T-DCF, since the geometry defines their presence as directly proportional to the square of the diameter. This higher absorption enables amplification of ultrafast lasers by very short amplifiers only tens of centimeters long, providing high fidelity ultrashort pulse amplification.

=== Simplicity of production ===
One of the significant advantages of T-DCF is the simplicity of production. The preform production for special high power fibers (microstructured rod type fibers, 3C or LCF fibers) involves complex technology and strict structural requirements. Conversely, T-DCF is made using standard fiber preforms. Simple production techniques of varying of the drawing speed during the pulling process leads to the fiber diameter changing along its length. T-DCF production is only marginally more complex than the production of a regular active fiber.
