= Field equation =

Partial differential equation describing physical fields

In theoretical physics and applied mathematics, a field equation is a partial differential equation which determines the dynamics of a physical field, specifically the time evolution and spatial distribution of the field. The solutions to the equation are mathematical functions which correspond directly to the field, as functions of time and space. Since the field equation is a partial differential equation, there are families of solutions which represent a variety of physical possibilities. Usually, there is not just a single equation, but a set of coupled equations which must be solved simultaneously. Field equations are not ordinary differential equations since a field depends on space and time, which requires at least two variables.

Whereas the "wave equation", the "diffusion equation", and the "continuity equation" all have standard forms (and various special cases or generalizations), there is no single, special equation referred to as "the field equation".

The topic broadly splits into equations of classical field theory and quantum field theory. Classical field equations describe many physical properties like temperature of a substance, velocity of a fluid, stresses in an elastic material, electric and magnetic fields from a current, etc. They also describe the fundamental forces of nature, like electromagnetism and gravity. In quantum field theory, particles or systems of "particles" like electrons and photons are associated with fields, allowing for infinite degrees of freedom (unlike finite degrees of freedom in particle mechanics) and variable particle numbers which can be created or annihilated.

== Generalities ==
=== Origin ===
Usually, field equations are postulated (like the Einstein field equations and the Schrödinger equation, which underlies all quantum field equations) or obtained from the results of experiments (like Maxwell's equations). The extent of their validity is their ability to correctly predict and agree with experimental results.

From a theoretical viewpoint, field equations can be formulated in the frameworks of Lagrangian field theory, Hamiltonian field theory, and field theoretic formulations of the principle of stationary action. Given a suitable Lagrangian or Hamiltonian density, a function of the fields in a given system, as well as their derivatives, the principle of stationary action will obtain the field equation.

=== Symmetry ===
In both classical and quantum theories, field equations will satisfy the symmetry of the background physical theory. Most of the time Galilean symmetry is enough, for speeds (of propagating fields) much less than light. When particles and fields propagate at speeds close to light, Lorentz symmetry is one of the most common settings because the equation and its solutions are then consistent with special relativity.

Another symmetry arises from gauge freedom, which is intrinsic to the field equations. Fields which correspond to interactions may be gauge fields, which means they can be derived from a potential, and certain values of potentials correspond to the same value of the field.

=== Classification ===
Field equations can be classified in many ways: classical or quantum, nonrelativistic or relativistic, according to the spin or mass of the field, and the number of components the field has and how they change under coordinate transformations (e.g. scalar fields, vector fields, tensor fields, spinor fields, twistor fields etc.). They can also inherit the classification of differential equations, as linear or nonlinear, the order of the highest derivative, or even as fractional differential equations. Gauge fields may be classified as in group theory, as abelian or nonabelian.

=== Waves ===
Field equations underlie wave equations, because periodically changing fields generate waves. Wave equations can be thought of as field equations, in the sense they can often be derived from field equations. Alternatively, given suitable Lagrangian or Hamiltonian densities and using the principle of stationary action, the wave equations can be obtained also.

For example, Maxwell's equations can be used to derive inhomogeneous electromagnetic wave equations, and from the Einstein field equations one can derive equations for gravitational waves.

=== Supplementary equations to field equations ===
Not every partial differential equation (PDE) in physics is automatically called a "field equation", even if fields are involved. They are extra equations to provide additional constraints for a given physical system.

"Continuity equations" and "diffusion equations" describe transport phenomena, even though they may involve fields which influence the transport processes.

If a "constitutive equation" takes the form of a PDE and involves fields, it is not usually called a field equation because it does not govern the dynamical behaviour of the fields. They relate one field to another, in a given material. Constitutive equations are used along with field equations when the effects of matter need to be taken into account.

== Classical field equation ==
Classical field equations arise in continuum mechanics (including elastodynamics and fluid mechanics), heat transfer, electromagnetism, and gravitation.

Fundamental classical field equations include

- Newton's Law of Universal Gravitation for nonrelativistic gravitation.
- Einstein field equations for relativistic gravitation
- Maxwell's equations for electromagnetism.

Important equations derived from fundamental laws include:

- Navier–Stokes equations for fluid flow.

As part of real-life mathematical modelling processes, classical field equations are accompanied by other equations of motion, equations of state, constitutive equations, and continuity equations.

== Quantum field equation ==
In quantum field theory, particles are described by quantum fields which satisfy the Schrödinger equation. They are also creation and annihilation operators which satisfy commutation relations and are subject to the spin–statistics theorem.

Particular cases of relativistic quantum field equations include

- the Klein–Gordon equation for spin-0 particles
- the Dirac equation for spin-1/2 particles
- the Bargmann–Wigner equations for particles of any spin

In quantum field equations, it is common to use momentum components of the particle instead of position coordinates of the particle's location, the fields are in momentum space and Fourier transforms relate them to the position representation.

== See also ==
- Field strength
- Wave function
  - Fundamental interaction
  - Field coupling
  - Field decoupling
  - Coupling parameter
- Vacuum solution
