= Laser power scaling =

Power scaling of a laser is increasing its output power without changing the geometry, shape, or principle of operation. Power scalability is considered an important advantage in a laser design. This means it can increase power without changing outside features.

Usually, power scaling requires a more powerful pump source, stronger cooling, and an increase in size. It may also require reduction of the background loss in the laser resonator and, in particular, in the gain medium.

== Master Oscillator Power Amplifier (MOPA) ==
One way of achieving power scalability is the MOPA approach. The master oscillator (a seed laser to be amplified) produces a highly coherent beam, and an optical amplifier is used to increase the power of the beam while preserving its main properties. The master oscillator has no need to be powerful, and has no need to operate at high efficiency because the efficiency is determined mainly by the power amplifier. The combination of several laser amplifiers seeded by a common master oscillator is essential concept of the High Power Laser Energy Research Facility.

== Inherently scalable designs ==
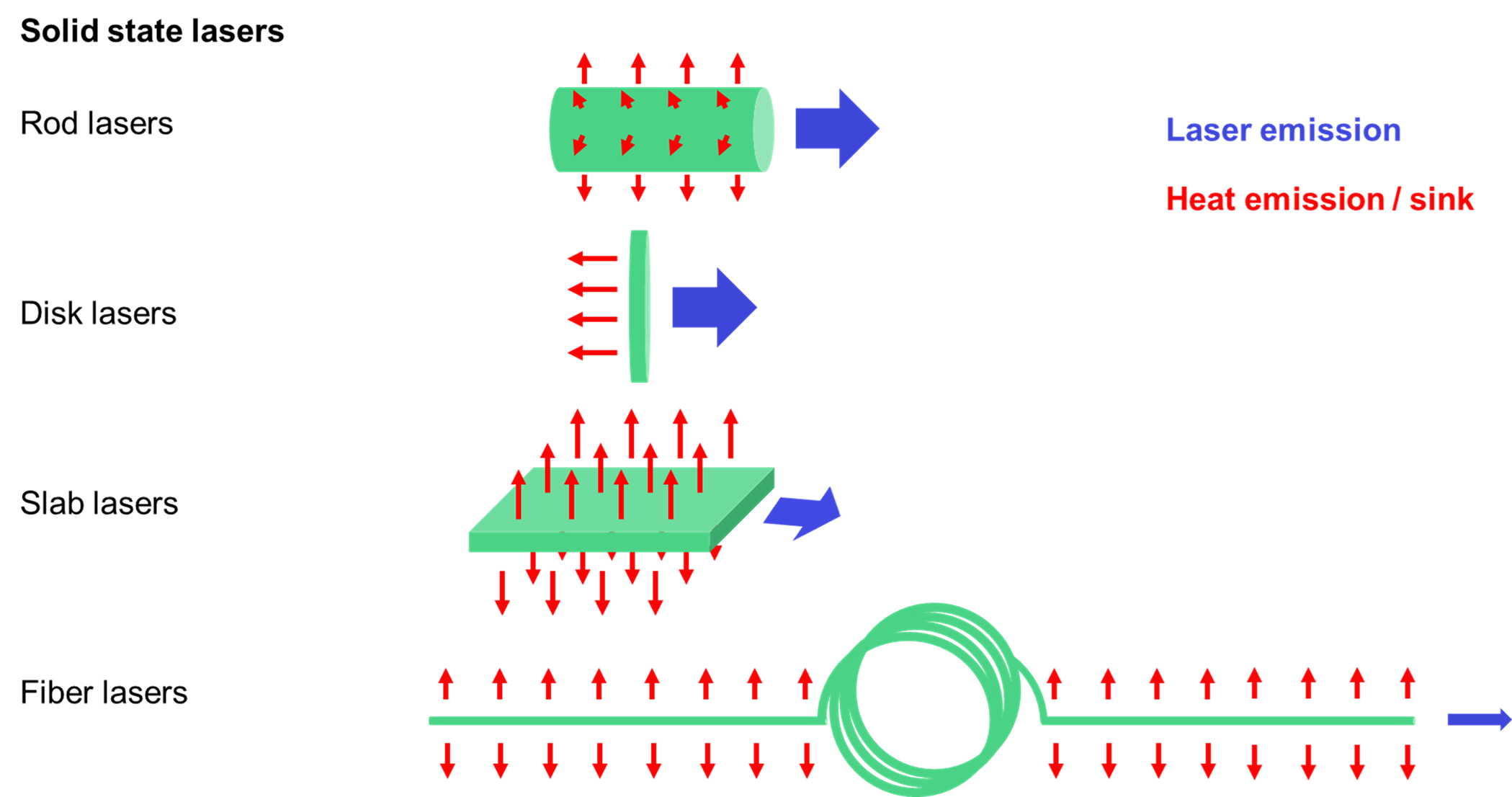
Schemes of different solid state laser geometries

The first laser built was a rod laser. Scaling of laser power is limited by the accumulation of heat in the center of the rod, leading to a thermal lens. This leads to a laser-induced raise in internal stresses and from a certain size and temperature to a destruction of the laser rod. An overview of cooling schemes mainly connected to power scaling is shown in the figure.

=== Disk lasers ===
One type of solid-state laser designed for good power scaling is the disk laser. Such lasers are scalable to a power of several kilowatts from a single active element in continuous-wave operation. For ultrafast think disk amplifiers, lasers with powers in the kilowatt regime have been demonstrated.

Amplified spontaneous emission, overheating and round-trip loss seem to be the most important processes that limit the power of disk lasers. For future power scaling, the reduction of the round-trip loss and/or combining of several active elements is required.

=== Fiber lasers ===
Fiber lasers are another type of solid-state laser with good power scaling. The power scaling of fiber lasers is limited by Raman scattering and Brillouin scattering, and by the fact that such lasers cannot be very long. The limited length of the double-clad fibers limits the usable power of the multi-mode pump, because the pump is not absorbed efficiently in the fiber's active core. Optimization of the shape of the cladding can extend the limit of power scaling.

=== Fiber disk lasers ===
The limit of power scaling of fiber lasers can be extended with lateral delivery of the pump. This is realized in fiber disk lasers.The pump in such a laser is delivered from side of a disk, made of coiled fiber with doped core. Several such disks (with a coolant between them) can be combined into a stack.

=== Gas lasers ===
Since power scaling is limited by the volume of the gain media, gas lasers (especially CO_{2} lasers) were the first lasers that exceeded the kilowatt limit. While increasing gas volumes is not challenging in the first place, pumping the respective volume homogeneously limited the power scaling to several tens of kilowatts in the 1970 and 1980s.

== Coherent addition and combining beams ==
Coherent addition of 4 fiber lasers.

Scalability can also be achieved by combining separate laser beams. Completely independent beams cannot usually be combined to produce a beam with higher radiance than each beam has alone. Beams can only be combined if they are coherent with each other. Such beams can be combined actively or passively.

In the passive combining (or coherent addition) of lasers, only the few modes common to all of the combined lasers can be above the lasing threshold. Efficient passive combining of eight lasers has been reported. Further power scaling requires exponential growth of the gain bandwidth and/or length of the individual lasers.

Active combining implies the real-time measurement of the phase of individual lasers' output, and quick adjustment to keep them all in phase. Such adjustment can be done by adaptive optics, which is effective for suppression of phase noise at acoustic frequencies. Faster schemes based on all-optical switching are being researched.
