= Amplified spontaneous emission =

Type of light that can be emitted by an optical amplifier

Amplified spontaneous emission (ASE) or superluminescence is light, produced by spontaneous emission, that has been optically amplified by the process of stimulated emission in a gain medium. It is inherent in the field of random lasers.

== Origins ==
ASE is produced when a laser gain medium is pumped to produce a population inversion. Feedback of the ASE by the laser's optical cavity may produce laser operation if the lasing threshold is reached. Excess ASE is an unwanted effect in lasers, since it is not coherent, and limits the maximum gain that can be achieved in the gain medium. ASE creates serious problems in any laser with high gain and/or large size. In this case, a mechanism to absorb or extract the incoherent ASE must be provided, otherwise the excitation of the gain medium will be depleted by the incoherent ASE rather than by the desired coherent laser radiation. ASE is especially problematic in lasers with short and wide optical cavities, such as disk lasers (active mirrors).

ASE can also be a desirable effect, finding use in broadband light sources. If the cavity has no optical feedback, lasing will be inhibited, resulting in a broad emission bandwidth due to the bandwidth of the gain medium. This results in low temporal coherence, offering reduced speckle noise when compared with a laser. Spatial coherence can be high, however, allowing for tight focusing of the radiation. These characteristics make such sources useful for fiber optic systems and optical coherence tomography. Examples of such sources include superluminescent diodes and doped fiber amplifiers.

=== In organic dye lasers ===
ASE in pulsed organic dye lasers can have very broad spectral characteristics (as much as 40–50 nm wide) and, as such, presents a serious challenge in the design and operation of tunable narrow-linewidth dye lasers. To suppress ASE in favor of pure laser emission, researchers use various approaches, including optimized laser cavity designs.

=== In disk lasers: Controversy ===
According to some publications, in the power scaling of disk lasers, the round-trip gain should be reduced, which means hardening of requirement on the background loss. Other researchers believe the existing disk lasers operate far from this limit, and power scaling can be achieved without modifying the existing laser materials.

=== In self healing dye doped polymers ===
In 2008, a group at Washington state university observed reversible photodegradation or simply, self healing in organic dyes like Disperse Orange 11 when doped in polymers. They used amplified spontaneous emission as a probe to study self healing properties.

=== In high-power short-pulse laser systems ===
In high-power CPA-laser systems with a peak power of several terawatt or petawatt, e.g. the POLARIS laser system, the ASE limits the temporal intensity contrast. After the compression of the laser pulse, which is temporally stretched during the amplification, the ASE causes a quasi-continuous pedestal which is partly located at times before the compressed laser pulse. Due to the high intensities within the focal spot of up to 10^22 W/cm^{2} the ASE is often sufficient to significantly disturb the experiment or even make the desired laser-target interaction impossible.

== See also ==
- Disk laser
- Maser
