= Regenerative amplification =

In laser science, regenerative amplification is a process used to generate short but strong pulses of laser light. It is based on a pulse trapped in a laser resonator, which stays in there until it extracts all of the energy stored in the amplification medium. Pulse trapping and dumping is done using a polarizer and a Pockels cell, which acts like a quarter wave-plate.

== Operating principle ==
When a pulse with vertical polarization is reflected off the polarizer, after a double pass through the Pockels cell it will become horizontally polarized and will be transmitted by the polarizer. After a double pass through the amplification medium, having the same horizontal polarization, the pulse will be transmitted by the polarizer. If a voltage is applied to the Pockels cell, a double pass through it will change the polarization of the pulse to vertical, so the pulse will be reflected off the polarizer and will exit the cavity. If no voltage is applied, then a double pass through the Pockels cell will not change the polarization and the pulse will get trapped inside the cavity of the resonator. The pulse can stay in the cavity until it reaches saturation or until it extracts most of the energy stored in the gain medium. When the pulse will achieve a high amplification, a second voltage can be applied to the Pockels cell in order to release the pulse from the resonator.

=== Radio frequency operation ===
Regenerative amplifier can also operate at Radio Frequency, using the feedback between the transistor's source and gate to transform a capacitive impedance on the transistor's source to a negative resistance on its gate. Compared to voltage-gated amplifiers, this "negative resistance amplifier" will only require a tiny amount of power to achieve high gain.

== See also ==
- Chirped pulse amplification
- Gain-switching
- Modelocking
- Optical amplifier
- Q-switching
- Raman amplification
