= Double-clad fiber =

Type of optical fiber

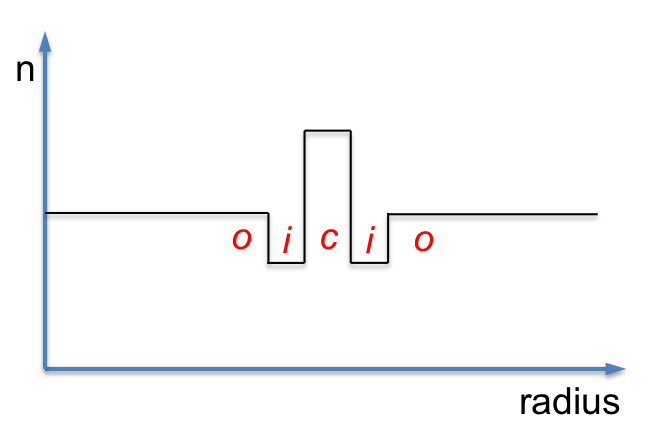
Refractive index profile of dispersion-compensating double-clad fiber. c:core, i:inner cladding, o:outer cladding.

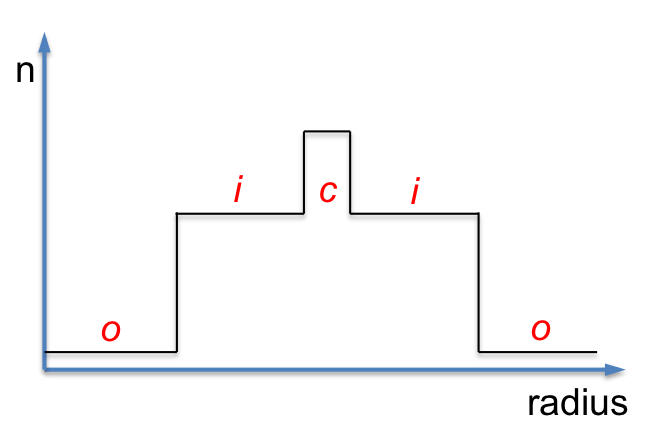
Refractive index profile of double-clad fiber for high power fiber lasers and amplifiers. c:core, i:inner cladding, o:outer cladding.

Double-clad fiber (DCF) is a class of optical fiber with a structure consisting of three layers of optical material instead of the usual two. The inner-most layer is called the core. It is surrounded by the inner cladding, which is surrounded by the outer cladding. The three layers are made of materials with different refractive indices.

There are two different kinds of double-clad fibers. The first was developed early in optical fiber history with the purpose of engineering the dispersion of optical fibers. In these fibers, the core carries the majority of the light, and the inner and outer cladding alter the waveguide dispersion of the core-guided signal. The second kind of fiber was developed in the late 1980s for use with high power fiber amplifiers and fiber lasers. In these fibers, the core is doped with active dopant material; it both guides and amplifies the signal light. The inner cladding and core together guide the pump light, which provides the energy needed to allow amplification in the core. In these fibers, the core has the highest refractive index and the outer cladding has the lowest. In most cases the outer cladding is made of a polymer material rather than glass.

== Dispersion-compensating fiber ==
In double-clad fiber for dispersion compensation, the inner cladding layer has lower refractive index than the outer layer. This type of fiber is also called depressed-inner-cladding fiber and W-profile fiber (from the fact that a symmetrical plot of its refractive index profile superficially resembles the letter W).

This type of double-clad fiber has the advantage of very low microbending losses. It also has two zero-dispersion points, and low dispersion over a much wider wavelength range than standard single clad fiber. Since the dispersion of such double-clad fibers can be engineered to a great extent, these fibers can be used for the compensation of chromatic dispersion in optical communications and other applications.

== Fiber for amplifiers and fiber lasers ==
Schematic diagram of cladding-pumped double-clad fiber laser

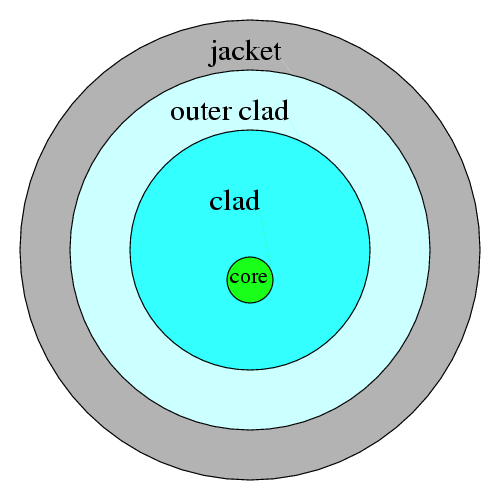
Cross-section of circular DCF with offset core

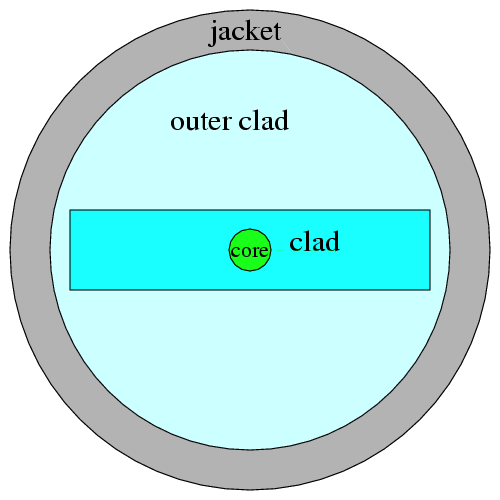
Cross-section of DCF with rectangular inner cladding

In modern double-clad fibers for high power fiber amplifiers and lasers, the inner cladding has a higher refractive index than the outer cladding. This enables the inner cladding to guide light by total internal reflection in the same way the core does, but for a different range of wavelengths. This allows diode lasers, which have high power but low radiance, to be used as the optical pump source. The pump light can be easily coupled into the large inner cladding, and propagates through the inner cladding while the signal propagates in the smaller core. The doped core gradually absorbs the cladding light as it propagates, driving the amplification process. This pumping scheme is often called cladding pumping, which is an alternative to the conventional core pumping, in which the pump light is coupled into the small core. The invention of cladding pumping by a Polaroid fiber research team (H. Po, et al.) revolutionized the design of fiber amplifiers and lasers. Using this method, modern fiber lasers can produce continuous power up to several kilowatts, while the signal light in the core maintains near diffraction-limited beam quality.

The shape of the cladding is very important, especially when the core diameter is small compared to the size of the inner cladding. Circular symmetry in a double-clad fiber seems to be the worst solution for a fiber laser; in this case, many modes of the light in the cladding miss the core and hence cannot be used to pump it. In the language of geometrical optics, most of the rays of the pump light do not pass through the core, and hence cannot pump it. Ray tracing, simulations of the paraxial propagation and mode analysis give similar results.

=== Chaotic fibers ===
In general, modes of a waveguide have "scars", which correspond to the classical trajectories. The scars may avoid the core, then the mode is not coupled, and it is vain to excite such a mode in the double-clad fiber amplifier. The scars can be distributed more or less uniformly in so-called chaotic fibers have more complicated cross-sectional shape and provide more uniform distribution of intensity in the inner cladding, allowing efficient use of the pump light. However, the scarring takes place even in chaotic fibers.

==== Spiral shape ====
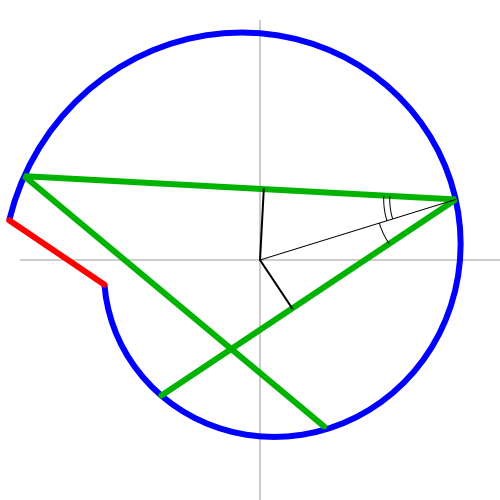
Spiral-shaped cladding (blue), its chunk (red), and 3 segments of a ray (green).

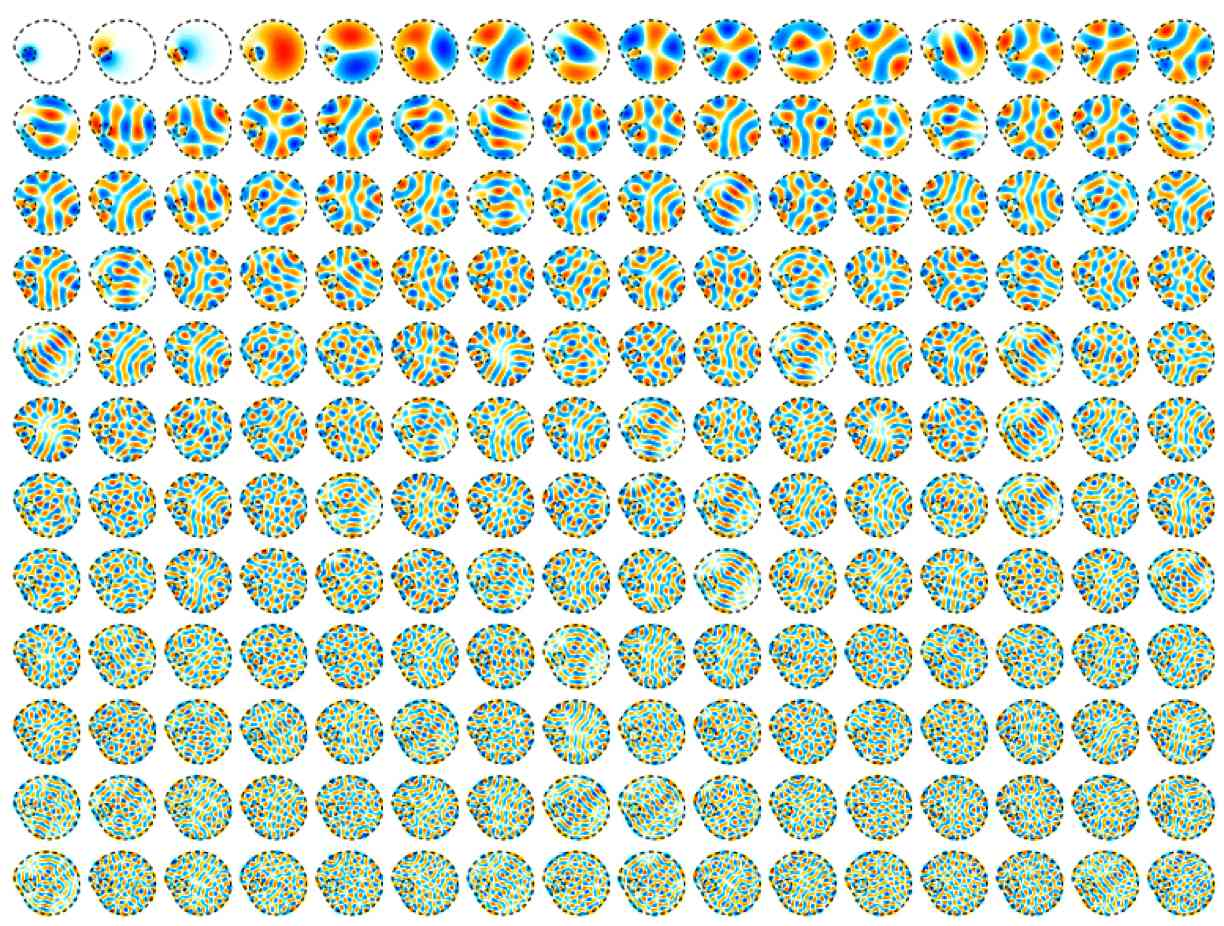
Modes of spiral-shaped double-clad fiber.

An almost-circular shape with small spiral deformation seems to be the most efficient for chaotic fibers. In such a fiber, the angular momentum of a ray increases at each reflection from the smooth wall, until the ray hits the "chunk", at which the spiral curve is broken (see figure at right). The core, placed in vicinity of this chunk, is intercepted more regularly by all the rays compared to other chaotic fibers. This behavior of rays has an analogy in wave optics. In the language of modes, all the modes have non-zero derivative in vicinity of the chunk, and cannot avoid the core if it is placed there. One example of modes is shown in the figure below and to the right. Although some of modes show scarring and wide voids, none of these voids cover the core.

The property of DCFs with spiral-shaped cladding can be interpreted as conservation of angular momentum. The square of the derivative of a mode at the boundary can be interpreted as pressure. Modes (as well as rays) touching the spiral-shaped boundary transfer some angular momentum to it. This transfer of angular momentum should be compensated by pressure at the chunk. Therefore, no one mode can avoid the chunk. Modes can show strong scarring along the classical trajectories (rays) and wide voids, but at least one of scars should approach the chunk to compensate for the angular momentum transferred by the spiral part.

The interpretation in terms of angular momentum indicates the optimum size of the chunk. There is no reason to make the chunk larger than the core; a large chunk would not localize the scars sufficiently to provide coupling with the core. There is no reason to localize the scars within an angle smaller than the core: the small derivative to the radius makes the manufacturing less robust; the larger $R'(\phi)$ is, the larger the fluctuations of shape that are allowed without breaking the condition $R'(\phi)>0$. Therefore, the size of the chunk should be of the same order as the size of the core.

More rigorously, the property of the spiral-shaped domain follows from the theorem about boundary behavior of modes of the Dirichlet Laplacian. Although this theorem is formulated for the core-less domain, it prohibits the modes avoiding the core. A mode avoiding the core, then, should be similar to that of the core-less domain.

Stochastic optimization of the cladding shape confirms that an almost-circular spiral realizes the best coupling of pump into the core.

=== Tapered ===
Tapered double-clad fiber (T-DCF) is a fiber whose outer and inner claddings and core diameters vary smoothly with length. The core at narrow side of T-DCF supports propagation of the fundamental mode only, whereas at the wide side the core is able to guide many modes. However, it was shown experimentally that light launched into the narrow end of a T-DCF propagates into the wide core without any changes of mode content. As a result, at the wide (substantially multimode) end of T-DCF light propagates only in the lowest-order mode with excellent beam quality. Thus, tapered fiber is a unique and easy way to implement fundamental mode regime propagation (and amplification) in a multimode fiber.

=== Filling factor ===
Estimates of the pump efficiency in a double-clad fiber with $F=0.8$ (blue) and $F=0.9$ (red), discussed in compared to the results of the ray tracing simulations(black curves).

The efficiency of absorption of pumping energy in the fiber is an important parameter of a double-clad fiber laser. In many cases this efficiency can be approximated with

$$1- \exp\left( - F \frac{\pi r^2}{S}\alpha L \right) ,$$

where

$S$ is the cross-sectional area of the cladding
$r$ is the radius of the core (which is taken to be circular)
$\alpha$ is the absorption coefficient of pump light in the core
$L$ is the length of the double-clad fiber, and
$F$ is a dimensionless adjusting parameter, which is sometimes called the "filling factor"; $0<F<1$.

The filling factor may depend on the initial distribution of the pump light, the shape of the cladding, and the position of the core within it.

The exponential behavior of the efficiency of absorption of pump in the core is not obvious. One could expect that some modes of the cladding (or some rays) are better coupled to the core than others; therefore, the "true" dependence could be a combination of several exponentials. Only comparison with simulations justifies this approximation, as shown in the figure above and to the right. In particular, this approximation does not work for circular fibers, see the initial work by Bedo et al., cited below. For chaotic fibers, $F$ approaches unity. The value of $F$ can be estimated by numerical analysis with propagation of waves, expansion by modes or by geometrical optics ray tracing, and values 0.8 and 0.9 are only empirical adjusting parameters, which provide good agreement of the simple estimate with numerical simulations for two specific classes of double-clad fibers: circular offset and rectangular. Obviously, the simple estimate above fails when the offset parameter becomes small compared to the size of cladding.

The filling factor $F$ approaches unity especially quickly in the spiral-shaped cladding, due to the special boundary behavior of the modes of the Dirichlet Laplacian. Designers of double-clad fiber look for a reasonable compromise between the optimized shape (for the efficient coupling of pump into the core) and the simplicity of the manufacturing of the preform used to draw the fibers.

The power scaling of a fiber laser is limited by unwanted nonlinear effects such as stimulated Brillouin scattering and stimulated Raman scattering. These effects are minimized when the fiber laser is short. For efficient operation, however, the pump should be absorbed in the core along the short length; the estimate above applies in this optimistic case. In particular, the higher the step in refractive index from inner to outer cladding, the better-confined the pump is. As a limiting case, the index step can be of order of two, from glass to air. The estimate with filling factor gives an estimate of how short an efficient double-clad fiber laser can be, due to reduction in size of the inner cladding.

=== Alternative structures ===
For good cladding shapes the filling factor $F$, defined above, approaches unity; the following enhancement is possible at various kinds of tapering of the cladding; non-conventional shapes of such cladding are suggested.

Planar waveguides with an active gain medium take an intermediate position between conventional solid-state lasers and double-clad fiber lasers. The planar waveguide may confine a multi-mode pump and a high-quality signal beam, allowing efficient coupling of the pump, and diffraction-limited output.
