= McCumber relation =

The McCumber relation (or McCumber theory) is a relationship between the effective cross-sections of absorption and emission of light in the physics of solid-state lasers. It is named after Dean McCumber, who proposed the relationship in 1964.

== Definition ==
Let $\sigma_{\rm a}(\omega)$ be the effective absorption cross-section $\sigma_{\rm e}(\omega)$ be effective emission cross-sections at frequency $\omega$, and let $~T~$ be the effective temperature of the medium. The McCumber relation is

(1) $\frac{\sigma_{\rm e}(\omega)}{\sigma_{\rm a}(\omega)}\exp\!\left( \frac{\hbar \omega}{k_{\rm B} T}\right) =\left(\frac{N_1}{N_2}\right)_T =\exp\!\left( \frac{\hbar \omega_{\rm z}}{k_{\rm B} T}\right)$

where $\left(\frac{N_1}{N_2}\right)_T$ is thermal steady-state ratio of populations; frequency $\omega_{\rm z}$ is called "zero-line" frequency; $\hbar$ is the Planck constant and $k_{\rm B}$ is the Boltzmann constant. Note that the right-hand side of Equation (1) does not depend on $~\omega~$.

== Gain ==
It is typical that the lasing properties of a medium are determined by the temperature and the population at the excited laser level, and are not sensitive to the method of excitation used to achieve it. In this case, the absorption cross-section $\sigma_{\rm a}(\omega)$ and the emission cross-section $\sigma_{\rm e}(\omega)$ at frequency $~\omega~$ can be related to the lasers gain in such a way, that the gain at this frequency can be determined as follows:

(2) $~~~~~~~~~~~~~~~G(\omega)=N_2 \sigma_{\rm e}(\omega)-N_1 \sigma_{\rm a}(\omega)$

D.E.McCumber had postulated these properties and found that the emission and absorption cross-sections are not independent; they are related with Equation (1).

== Idealized atoms ==
In the case of an idealized two-level atom the detailed balance for the emission and absorption which preserves the Planck formula for the black-body radiation leads to equality of cross-section of absorption and emission. In the solid-state lasers the splitting of each of laser levels leads to the broadening which greatly exceeds the natural spectral linewidth. In the case of an ideal two-level atom, the product of the linewidth and the lifetime is of order of unity, which obeys the Heisenberg uncertainty principle. In solid-state laser materials, the linewidth is several orders of magnitude larger so the spectra of emission and absorption are determined by distribution of excitation among sublevels rather than by the shape of the spectral line of each individual transition between sublevels. This distribution is determined by the effective temperature within each of laser levels. The McCumber hypothesis is that the distribution of excitation among sublevels is thermal. The effective temperature determines the spectra of emission and absorption ( The effective temperature is called a temperature by scientists even if the excited medium as whole is pretty far from the thermal state )

== Deduction ==
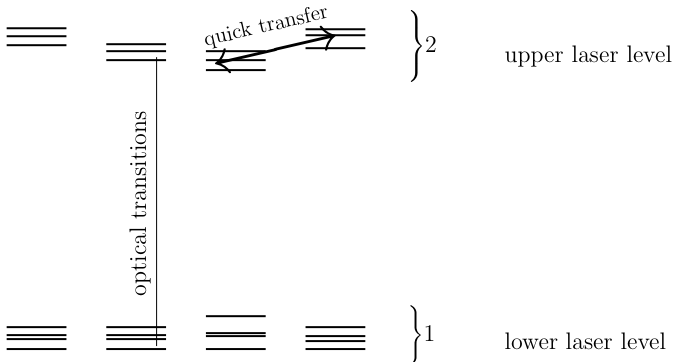
Fig.1. Sketch of sublevels

Consider the set of active centers (fig.1.). Assume fast transition between sublevels within each level, and slow transition between levels. According to the McCumber hypothesis, the cross-sections $\sigma_{\rm a}$ and $\sigma_{\rm e}$ do not depend on the populations $N_1$ and $N_2$. Therefore, we can deduce the relation, assuming the thermal state.

Let $~v(\omega)~$ be group velocity of light in the medium, the product $~n_2\sigma_{\rm e}(\omega) v(\omega)D(\omega)~$ is spectral rate of stimulated emission, and $~n_1\sigma_{\rm a}(\omega) v(\omega)D(\omega)~$ is that of absorption; $a(\omega)n_2$ is spectral rate of spontaneous emission. (Note that in this approximation, there is no such thing as a spontaneous absorption) The balance of photons gives:

(3) $~~~ n_2\sigma_{\rm e}(\omega) v(\omega)D(\omega)+n_2 a(\omega)= n_1\sigma_{\rm a}(\omega) v(\omega)D(\omega) ~~~~~~~~~~~~~~~{\rm (balance)}$

Which can be rewritten as

(4) $~~~ D(\omega)= \frac{\frac{a(\omega)}{\sigma_{\rm e}(\omega) v(\omega)}} {\frac{n_1}{n_2} \frac{\sigma_{\rm a}(\omega)}{\sigma_{\rm e}(\omega)}-1} ~~~~~~~~~~~~~~{\rm (D1)}$

The thermal distribution of density of photons follows from blackbody radiation

(5) $~~~ D(\omega)~=~ \frac{\frac{1}{\pi^2} \frac{\omega^2}{c^3}} {\exp\!\left(\frac{\hbar\omega}{k_{\rm B}T}\right)-1} ~~~~~ {\rm (D2)}$

Both (4) and (5) hold for all frequencies $~\omega~$. For the case of idealized two-level active centers, $~\sigma_{\rm a}(\omega)=\sigma_{\rm e}(\omega)~$, and $~n_1/n_2=\exp\!\left( \frac{\hbar\omega}{k_{\rm B}T} \right)$, which leads to the relation between the spectral rate of spontaneous emission $a(\omega)$ and the emission cross-section $~\sigma_{\rm e}(\omega)~$. (We keep the term probability of emission for the quantity $~a(\omega){\rm d}\omega{\rm d}t~$, which is probability of emission of a photon within small spectral interval $~(\omega,\omega+{\rm d}\omega)~$ during a short time interval $~(t,t+{\rm d}t)~$, assuming that at time $~t~$ the atom is excited.) The relation (D2) is a fundamental property of spontaneous and stimulated emission, and perhaps the only way to prohibit a spontaneous break of the thermal equilibrium in the thermal state of excitations and photons.

For each site number $~s~$, for each sublevel number $j$, the partial spectral emission probability $~a_{s,j}(\omega)~$ can be expressed from consideration of idealized two-level atoms:

(6) $~~~ a_{s,j}(\omega)=\sigma_{s,j}(\omega) \frac{\omega^2 v(\omega)}{\pi^2c^3}~~. ~~~~~~~~~~~~~~~~{\rm comparison1} ~~{\rm partial}$

Neglecting the cooperative coherent effects, the emission is additive: for any concentration $~q_{s}~$ of sites and for any partial population $~n_{s,j}~$ of sublevels, the same proportionality between $~a~$ and $~\sigma_{\rm e}~$ holds for the effective cross-sections:

(7) $\frac{a(\omega)}{\sigma_{\rm e}(\omega)}= \frac{\omega^2 v(\omega)}{\pi^2c^3} ~~~~~~~~~~~~~~~~~~(\rm comparison)(av)$

Then, the comparison of (D1) and (D2) gives the relation

(8) $\frac{n_1}{n_2} \frac{\sigma_{\rm a}(\omega)} {\sigma_{\rm e}(\omega)}= \exp\!\left( \frac{\hbar\omega}{k_{\rm B}T}\right)~~. ~~~~~~~~{\rm (n1n2) (mc1)}$

This relation is equivalent of the McCumber relation (mc), if we define the zero-line frequency $\omega_{Z}$ as solution of equation

(9) $~\left(\frac{n_1}{n_2}\right)_{\!T}= \exp\!\left(\frac{\hbar \omega_{\rm Z}}{k_{\rm B}T}\right)~~~~,~~~$

the subscript $~T~$ indicates that the ratio of populations in evaluated in the thermal state. The zero-line frequency can be expressed as

(10) $\omega_{\rm Z}=\frac{k_{\rm B}T}{\hbar} \ln \left(\frac{n_1}{n_2}\right)_{T} ~~~~~~~~~~~~~~~~.~~{(\rm oz)}$

Then (n1n2) becomes equivalent of the McCumber relation (mc).

No specific property of sublevels of active medium is required to keep the McCumber relation. It follows from the assumption about quick transfer of energy among excited laser levels and among lower laser levels. The McCumber relation (mc) has the same range of validity as the concept of the emission cross-section itself.

=== Confirmation ===
The McCumber relation is confirmed for various media. In particular, relation (1) makes it possible to approximate two functions of frequency, emission and absorption cross sections, with single fit .

== Violations and perpetual motion ==
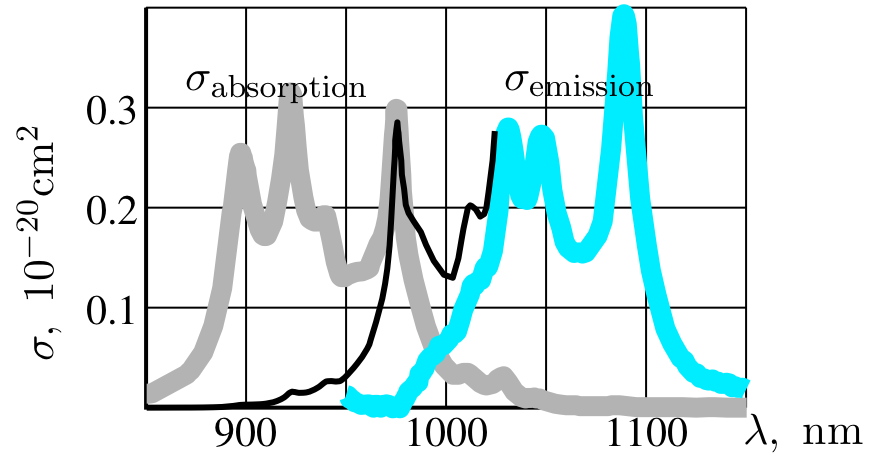
Fig.2. Cross-sections for Yb:Gd_{2}SiO_{5} versus $\lambda=\frac{2\pi c}{\omega}$

In 2006 the strong violation of McCumber relation was observed for Yb:Gd_{2}SiO_{5} and reported in 3 independent journals. Typical behavior of the cross-sections reported is shown in Fig.2 with thick curves. The emission cross-section is practically zero at wavelength 975 nm; this property makes Yb:Gd_{2}SiO_{5} an excellent material for efficient solid-state lasers.

However, the property reported (thick curves) is not compatible with the second law of thermodynamics. With such a material, the perpetual motion device would be possible. It would be sufficient to fill a box with reflecting walls with Yb:Gd_{2}SiO_{5} and allow it to exchange radiation with a black body through a spectrally-selective window which is transparent in vicinity of 975 nm and reflective at other wavelengths. Due to the lack of emissivity at 975 nm the medium should warm, breaking the thermal equilibrium.

On the base of the second Law of thermodynamics, the experimental results were refuted in 2007. With the McCumber theory, the correction was suggested for the effective emission cross section (black thin curve). Then this correction was confirmed experimentally.
