= Self-pulsation =

Self-pulsation is a transient phenomenon in continuous-wave lasers. Self-pulsation takes place at the beginning of laser action. As the pump is switched on, the gain in the active medium rises and exceeds the steady-state value. The number of photons in the cavity increases, depleting the gain below the steady-state value, and so on. The laser pulsates; the output power at the peaks can be orders of magnitude larger than that between pulses. After several strong peaks, the amplitude of pulsation reduces, and the system behaves as a linear oscillator with damping. Then the pulsation decays; this is the beginning of the continuous-wave operation.

== Equations ==
The simple model of self-pulsation deals with number $X$ of photons in the laser cavity and number $~Y~$ of excitations in the gain medium. The evolution can be described with equations:

$$~\begin{align}
{{\rm d}X}/{{\rm d}t} & = KXY-UX \\
{{\rm d}Y}/{{\rm d}t} & = - KXY-VY+W
\end{align}$$

where $~K = \sigma/(s t_{\rm r})~$ is coupling constant,
$~U = \theta L~$ is rate of relaxation of photons in the laser cavity,
$~V = 1/\tau~$ is rate of relaxation of excitation of the gain medium,
$~W = P_{\rm p}/({\hbar\omega_{\rm p}})~$ is the pumping rate;
$~t_{\rm r}~$ is the round-trip time of light in the laser resonator,
$~s~$ is area of the pumped region (good mode matching is assumed);
$~\sigma~$ is the emission cross-section at the signal frequency $~\omega_{\rm s}~$.
$~\theta~$ is the transmission coefficient of the output coupler.
$~\tau~$ is the lifetime of excitation of the gain medium.
$P_{\rm p}$ is power of pump absorbed in the gain medium (which is assumed to be constant).

Such equations appear in the similar form (with various notations for variables) in textbooks on laser physics, for example, the monography by A.Siegman.

== Steady-state solution ==
$$\begin{align}
X_0 & = \frac{W}{U}-\frac{V}{K} \\
Y_0 & = \frac{U}{K}
\end{align}$$

== Weak pulsation ==
Decay of small pulsation occurs with rate

$$\begin{align}
\Gamma & = KW/(2U) \\
\Omega & = \sqrt{w^2-\Gamma^2}
\end{align}$$

where

$$w=\sqrt{KW-UV}$$

Practically, this rate can be orders of magnitude smaller than the repetition rate of pulses. In this case, the decay of the self-pulsation in a real lasers is determined by other physical processes, not taken into account with the initial equations above.

== Strong pulsation ==
The transient regime can be important for the quasi-continuous lasers that needs to operate in the pulsed regime, for example, to avoid the overheating.

The only numerical solutions were believed to exist for the strong pulsation, spiking. The strong spiking is possible, when $U/V \ll 1$, i.e., the lifetime of excitations in the active medium is large compared to the lifetime of photons inside the cavity. The spiking is possible at low dumping of self-pulsation, in the corresponding both parameters $u$ and $~v^{}~$ should be small.

The intent of realization of the oscillator Toda at the optical bench is shown in Fig.4. The colored curves are oscillograms of two shouts of the quasi-continuous diode-pumped microchip solid-state laser on Yb:YAG ceramics, described by. The thick black curve represents the approximation within the simple model with oscillator Toda. Only qualitative agreement takes place.

== Toda Oscillator ==
Change of variables

$$\begin{align}
X & = X_0 \exp(x) \\
Y & = Y_0+X_0 y \\
t & = z/w
\end{align}$$

lead to the equation for Toda oscillator. At weak decay of the self-pulsation (even in the case of strong spiking), the solution of corresponding equation can be approximated through elementary function. The error of such approximation of the solution of the initial equations is small compared to the precision of the model.

The pulsation of real the output of a real lasers in the transient regime usually show significant deviation from the simple model above, although the model gives good qualitative description of the phenomenon of self-pulsation.

== See also ==
- Solid-state lasers
- Disk laser
