= Round-trip gain =

Round-trip gain refers to the laser physics, and laser cavities (or laser resonators). It is gain, integrated along a ray, which makes a round-trip in the cavity.

At the continuous-wave operation, the round-trip gain exactly compensates both the output coupling of the cavity and its background loss.

== Round-trip gain in geometric optics ==
Generally, the Round-trip gain may depend on the frequency, on the position and tilt of the ray, and even on the polarization of light. Usually, we may assume that at some moment of time, at reasonable frequency of operation, the gain $~G(x,y,z)~$ is function of the Cartesian coordinates $~x~$, $~y~$, and $~z~$. Then, assuming that the geometrical optics is applicable the round-trip gain $~g~$ can be expressed as follows:

$$~g=\int G(x(a),y(a),z(a))~{\rm d}a~$$,

where $~a~$ is path along the ray, parametrized with functions $~x(a)~$, $~y(a)~$, $~z(a)~$; the integration is performed along the whole ray, which is supposed to form the closed loop.

In simple models, the flat-top distribution of pump and gain $~G~$ is assumed to be constant. In the case of simplest cavity, the round-trip gain $~g=2Gh~$, where $~h~$ is length of the cavity; the laser light is supposed to go forward and back, this leads to the coefficient 2 in the estimate.

In the steady-state continuous wave operation of a laser, the round-trip gain is determined by the reflectivity of the mirrors (in the case of stable cavity) and the magnification coefficient in the case of unstable resonator (unstable cavity).

== Coupling parameter ==
The coupling parameter $~\theta~$ of a laser resonator determines, what part of the energy of the laser field in the cavity goes out at each round-trip. This output can be determined by the transmitivity of the output coupler, or the magnification coefficient in the case of unstable cavity.

== Round-trip loss (background loss) ==
The background loss, of the round-trip loss $~\beta~$ determines, what part of the energy of the laser field becomes unusable at each round-trip; it can be absorbed or scattered.

At the self-pulsation, the gain is late to respond the variation of number of photons in the cavity. Within the simple model, the round-trip loss and the output coupling determine the damping parameters of the equivalent oscillator Toda.

At the steady-state operation, the round-trip gain $~g~$ exactly compensate both, the output coupling and losses:

$$~\exp(g)~(1-\beta-\theta)=1~$$.

Assuming, that the gain is small ($~g~\ll 1~$), this relation can be written as follows:

$$~g=\beta+\theta~$$

Such as relation is used in analytic estimates of the performance of lasers. In particular, the round-trip loss $~\beta~$ may be one of important parameters which limit the output power of a disk laser; at the power scaling, the gain $~G~$ should be decreased (in order to avoid the exponential growth of the amplified spontaneous emission), and the round-trip gain $~g~$ should remain larger than the background loss $~\beta~$; this requires to increase of the thickness of the slab of the gain medium; at certain thickness, the overheating prevents the efficient operation.

For the analysis of processes in active medium, the sum $~\beta+\theta~$ can be also called "loss". This notation leads to confusions as soon as one is interested, which part of the energy is absorbed and scattered, and which part of such a "loss" is actually wanted and useful output of the laser.
