= Raman amplification =

Inelastic optical scattering phenomenon

Raman amplification /ˈrɑːmən/ is a way of increasing the signal strength in an optical fiber. It is often used in a fiber that carries a signal for a long distance (such as in an undersea cable). Technically, it works by stimulating Raman scattering, in which a lower frequency 'signal' photon induces inelastic scattering of a higher-frequency 'pump' photon in an optical medium in the nonlinear regime. As a result, another 'signal' photon is produced, with the surplus energy resonantly passed to the vibrational states of the medium, increasing the signal strength. This process (like other stimulated emission processes), allows all-optical amplification. This kind of amplification is independent of the modulation, formatting, and bandwidth of the signal being amplified. This, in turn, allows the endpoints of the fiber to be upgraded to newer modulation methods, while the amplifiers remain unchanged. That allows existing undersea cables to carry more data than they did when they were built, without the expensive process of dredging up the cable and replacing all the amplifiers.

Today, Optical fiber is most often used as the nonlinear medium for stimulated Raman scattering for telecom purposes. In this case it has a resonance frequency downshift of ~11 THz (corresponding to a wavelength shift at ~1550 nm of ~90 nm). The stimulated Raman scattering amplification process can be readily cascaded, thus accessing essentially any wavelength in the fiber's low-loss frequency ranges (both 1310 and 1550). In addition to applications in nonlinear and ultrafast optics, Raman amplification is used in optical telecommunications, allowing all-band wavelength coverage and in-line distributed signal amplification.

== Long haul and Ultralong haul optical transmission applications ==
In-line Raman amplifiers provide distributed gain along the optical fiber, significantly improving the optical signal-to-noise ratio (OSNR) compared to traditional lumped amplifiers like EDFAs, which enables longer transmission spans in long-haul terrestrial and submarine networks without regeneration. They reduce nonlinear effects by maintaining lower average signal power levels, supporting higher capacities and broader bandwidths in dense wavelength-division multiplexing (DWDM) systems. For submarine applications, Raman amplification minimizes the number of underwater repeaters, enhancing reliability and cost-efficiency, while in terrestrial setups, it facilitates ultra-long-haul links over thousands of kms with reduced infrastructure needs.

== See also ==
- Raman laser
- C.V. Raman
- Raman amplifier
- Chirped pulse amplification
- Regenerative amplification
