= Erbium-doped waveguide amplifier =

An erbium-doped waveguide amplifier (or EDWA) is a type of an optical amplifier enhanced with erbium. It is a close relative of an EDFA, erbium-doped fiber amplifier, and in fact EDWA's basic operating principles are identical to those of the EDFA. Both of them can be used to amplify infrared light at wavelengths in optical communication bands between 1500 and 1600 nm. However, whereas an EDFA is made using a free-standing fiber, an EDWA is typically produced on a planar substrate, sometimes in ways that are very similar to the methods used in electronic integrated circuit manufacturing. Therefore, the main advantage of EDWAs over EDFAs lies in their potential to be intimately integrated with other optical components on the same planar substrate and thus making EDFAs unnecessary.

== Early development ==
The early EDWA development was motivated by a promise (or a hope) that it can deliver smaller and cheaper components than those achievable with EDFAs. The development of waveguide amplifiers, along with other types of optical amplifiers, experienced a very rapid growth throughout 1990's. Several research labs, private companies and universities took part in this work by focusing on working out the basic material science necessary for their manufacturing. They included Bell Laboratories (Lucent Technologies, US), Teem Photonics (Meylan, France), Molecular OptoElectronics Corp. (New York, US) and a few others. Each of them took a unique path in their research and experimented with different approaches. However, most of these efforts since then have been discontinued.

MOEC developed a unique micro-mechanical approach to producing channel waveguides that can be doped with rare-earth elements at high concentrations. They were able to cut, polish and glue together straight sections of channel waveguides of varying lengths (typically few centimeters) and cross-sections (typically few tens of microns). These waveguides were usually characterized by relatively large cross-section areas and high index contrast. As a result, unlike single mode fibers, they were multi-mode and able to maintain multiple optical modes at the same wavelength and polarization. The primary way to couple light in and out of such a waveguide was by using bulk optical components, such as prisms, mirrors and lenses, which further complicated their use in fiber-optic systems.

Teem Photonics used an ion-exchange process to produce a channel waveguide in a rare-earth doped phosphate glass. Resulting waveguides were typically single-mode waveguides, which could be easily integrated with other fiber-optic components. In addition, several different elements could be integrated in one circuit, including gain blocks, couplers, splitters and others. However, due to a relatively low refractive index contrast between the core and the cladding in these waveguides, the selection of optical elements that can be produced on such a platform was rather limited and the resulting circuit size tended to be large, i.e. comparable to then available fiber-optic counterparts.

Bell Labs took yet another approach to making EDWAs by using a so-called "silicon optical bench" technology. They experimented with different glass compositions, including aluminosilicate, phosphate, soda-lime and others, which could be deposited as thin layers on top of silicon substrates. Different waveguides and waveguide circuits could be subsequently formed using photolithography and different etching techniques. Bells Labs successfully showed not only high gain amplification, but also the capabilities to integrate active and passive planar waveguide elements, e.g. a gain block and a pump coupler, in the same circuit.

== Later years ==
Commercial EDWA development efforts intensified in 2000's when Inplane Photonics joined the race. In general, their approach was similar to that of Bell Labs, i.e. the silica-on-silicon technology. Inplane Photonics, however, was able to further improve and expand capabilities of this technology by integrating two to three different waveguide types on the same chip. This feature allowed them to monolithically integrate gain blocks (active waveguides providing amplification) with different passive elements, such as couplers, arrayed waveguide gratings (AWG), optical taps, turning mirrors and so on. Some of advanced Inplane Photonics' photonic circuits containing EDWAs were used by Lockheed Martin in their development of new high-speed on-board communication systems for the US Air Force. Inplane Photonics and its technology was later acquired by CyOptics.

== Comparison between EDWA and EDFA ==
EDWA and EDFA are difficult to compare without a proper context. At least three different scenarios or use cases can be analyzed: (1) stand-alone amplifiers, (2) stand-alone lasers and (3) integrated components.

=== Stand-alone amplifiers ===
EDWAs are typically characterized by higher erbium concentrations and background losses than those in regular EDFAs. Those lead to relatively higher noise figures and lower saturation powers, although the differences can be very small, sometimes amounting a fraction of dB (decibel). Thus for demanding applications, where it is important to minimize noise and maximize output power, an EDFA may be preferred over an EDWA. However, if the physical size of a device is a constraint, than an EDWA or an EDWA array may be a better choice.

=== Stand-alone lasers ===
An optical amplifier may be used as a part of a laser, e.g. a fiber laser. Some parameters, such as the noise figure, are less relevant for this application and therefore using an EDWA instead of an EDFA may be advantageous. EDWA-based lasers can be more compact and more tightly integrated with other laser components and elements. This feature allows one to create very unusual lasers that are difficult to implement by other means, as demonstrated by an MIT research group, which produced a very compact femtosecond laser with a very fast repetition rate.

=== Integrated components ===
An optical amplifier may be also used as a component in a larger system for compensating optical losses from other components in that system. The EDWA technology allows one to potentially produce a whole system using a single integrated optical circuit, as in a system-on-a-chip, rather than an assembly of individual fiber-optic components. In such systems, EDWA may then hold an advantage over EDFA-based solutions, due to the smaller size and potentially lower cost.
