= Figure-8 laser =

Type of fiber laser

Fiber laser with figure-8 ring resonator. In: pumping. Out: emitting light. 1: active fiber. 2: polarizer. 3: optical isolator. 4 WDM splitter. 50:50 splitter 50/50.

A figure-8 laser is a fiber laser with a figure-8-shaped ring resonator. It is used for making pico- and femtosecond soliton pulses. The typical spectrum of such a laser consists of a wide central peak and a few narrow lateral peaks that are placed symmetrically around it. The amplitudes of the narrow peaks are the same as or less than that of the central peak.

Both loops of the resonator work as Sagnac loops. The active medium of the laser is optical fiber with its core doped with rare-earth ions. It is placed asymmetrically with respect to the resonator loops to make a nonlinear difference in phase between opposite waves, ensuring mode locking. In 1992 a figure-8 laser was built with a smaller loop length of 1.6 m and a larger loop length of 60.8 m for generation of 315 fs pulses with repetition rate 125 MHz.

== Literature ==
- Agrawal, G. P. (2008). Applications of nonlinear fiber optics. Optics and Photonics Series. Vol. 10 (2nd ed.). Academic Press. doi:10.1016/B978-0-12-374302-2.X5001-3. ISBN 978-0-12-374302-2.
- Fermann, M. E.; Galvanauskas, A.; Sucha, G., eds. (2002). Ultrafast Lasers: Technology and Applications. CRC Press. doi:10.1201/9780203910207. ISBN 978-0-8247-4349-9.
