= Atomera =

American company

Atomera Incorporated
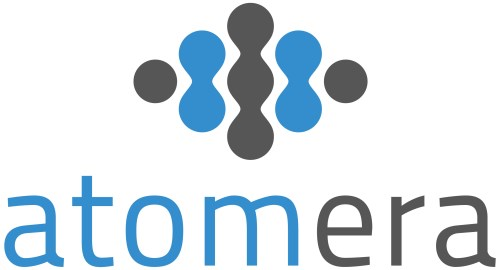
- Trade name: ATOM
- Formerly: Mears Technologies
- Type: Public
- Traded as: Nasdaq: ATOM; Russell Microcap Index component
- Industry: IP Licensing; Semiconductors
- Founded: 2001
- Founder: Robert J. Mears
- Headquarters: Los Gatos, California, United States
- Products: Mears Silicon Technology
- Website: www.atomera.com

Atomera Incorporated is a materials engineering company based in Los Gatos, California engaged in the development, commercialization and licensing of processes and technologies for the semiconductor industry. Atomera's research and development activities are focused on the development of Mears Silicon Technology (MST), a novel approach to the fabrication of semiconductor materials. MST is a scalable, high-performance, energy-efficient process technology that can be used to improve the performance, power and cost of semiconductor devices. The technology has been successfully demonstrated on consumer and industrial devices, and is currently being commercialized.

== History ==
Atomera was founded by Robert J. Mears in 2001 and is headquartered in Los Gatos, California. It was formerly known as Mears Technologies, Inc. and changed its name to Atomera Incorporated in January 2016. It is traded on NASDAQ as ATOM.

A master R&D service agreement was signed in 2017 between Atomera and TSI Semiconductors. Under this agreement with TSI, Atomera could shorten fab cycle times and accelerate to market timelines.

== Technology ==
=== Mears Silicon Technology ===
Atomera used atomic level material science to develop a material called Mears Silicon Technology (MST) in response to the slowdown in the advancement of Moore's law. MST is a thin film of typically 100 to 300 angstroms (or approximately 20 to 60 silicon atomic unit cells) thick which is a reengineered silicon. In 2018, Atomera Licensed MST Technology to Asahi Kasei Microdevices and STMicroelectronics.

==== Mears Silicon Technology Smart Profile (MST-SP) ====
In November 2021, Atomera unveiled a "proprietary technology design to improve the performance of 5V analog transistors by reducing channel on-resistance.”

== See also ==
- Materials science
