= Toda oscillator =

In physics, the Toda oscillator is a special kind of nonlinear oscillator. It represents a chain of particles with exponential potential interaction between neighbors. These concepts are named after Morikazu Toda. The Toda oscillator is used as a simple model to understand the phenomenon of self-pulsation, which is a quasi-periodic pulsation of the output intensity of a solid-state laser in the transient regime.

== Definition ==
The Toda oscillator is a dynamical system of any origin, which can be described with dependent coordinate $~x~$ and independent coordinate $~z~$, characterized in that the evolution along independent coordinate $~z~$ can be approximated with equation

$$\frac{{\rm d^{2}}x}{{\rm d}z^{2}}+
D(x)\frac{{\rm d}x}{{\rm d}z}+
\Phi'(x) =0,$$

where $~D(x)=u e^{x}+v~$, $~\Phi(x)=e^x-x-1~$ and prime denotes the derivative.

== Physical meaning ==
The independent coordinate $~z~$ has sense of time. Indeed, it may be proportional to time $~t~$ with some relation like $~z=t/t_0~$, where $~t_0~$ is constant.

The derivative $~\dot x=\frac{{\rm d}x}{{\rm d}z}$ may have sense of velocity of particle with coordinate $~x~$; then $~\ddot x=\frac{{\rm d}^2x}{{\rm d}z^2}~$ can be interpreted as acceleration; and the mass of such a particle is equal to unity.

The dissipative function $~D~$ may have sense of coefficient of the speed-proportional friction.

Usually, both parameters $~u~$ and $~v~$ are supposed to be positive; then this speed-proportional friction coefficient grows exponentially at large positive values of coordinate $~x~$.

The potential $~\Phi(x)=e^x-x-1~$ is a fixed function, which also shows exponential growth at large positive values of coordinate $~x~$.

In the application in laser physics, $~x~$ may have a sense of logarithm of number of photons in the laser cavity, related to its steady-state value. Then, the output power of such a laser is proportional to $~\exp(x)~$ and may show pulsation at oscillation of $~x~$.

Both analogies, with a unity mass particle and logarithm of number of photons, are useful in the analysis of behavior of the Toda oscillator.

== Energy ==
Rigorously, the oscillation is periodic only at $~u=v=0~$. Indeed, in the realization of the Toda oscillator as a self-pulsing laser, these parameters may have values of order of $~10^{-4}~$; during several pulses, the amplitude of pulsation does not change much. In this case, we can speak about the period of pulsation, since the function $~x=x(t)~$ is almost periodic.

In the case $~u=v=0~$, the energy of the oscillator $~E=\frac 12 \left(\frac{{\rm d}x}{{\rm d}z}\right)^{2}+\Phi(x)~$ does not depend on $~z~$, and can be treated as a constant of motion. Then, during one period of pulsation, the relation between $~x~$ and $~z~$ can be expressed analytically:

$$z=\pm\int_{x_\min}^{x_\max}\!\!\frac{{\rm d}a}
{\sqrt{2}\sqrt{E-\Phi(a)}}$$

where $~x_{\min}~$ and $~x_{\max}~$ are minimal and maximal values of $~x~$; this solution is written for the case when $\dot x(0)=0$.

however, other solutions may be obtained using the principle of translational invariance.

The ratio $~x_\max/x_\min=2\gamma~$ is a convenient parameter to characterize the amplitude of pulsation. Using this, we can express the median value $\delta=\frac{x_\max -x_\min}{1}$ as $\delta= \ln\frac{\sin(\gamma)}{\gamma}$; and the energy $E=E(\gamma)=\frac{\gamma}{\tanh(\gamma)}+\ln\frac{\sinh \gamma}{\gamma}-1$ is also an elementary function of $~\gamma~$.

In application, the quantity $E$ need not be the physical energy of the system; in these cases, this dimensionless quantity may be called quasienergy.

== Period of pulsation ==
The period of pulsation is an increasing function of the amplitude $~\gamma~$.

When $~\gamma \ll 1~$, the period $~T(\gamma)=2\pi \left( 1 + \frac{\gamma^2} {24} + O(\gamma^4) \right) ~$

When $~\gamma \gg 1~$, the period $~T(\gamma)= 4\gamma^{1/2} \left(1+O(1/\gamma)\right) ~$

In the whole range $~\gamma > 0~$, the period $~{T(\gamma)}~$ and frequency $~k(\gamma)=\frac{2\pi}{T(\gamma)}~$ can be approximated by

$$k_\text{fit}(\gamma)=
\frac{2\pi}
{T_\text{fit}(\gamma)}=$$
$$\left(
\frac
{
10630
+ 674\gamma
+ 695.2419\gamma^2
+ 191.4489\gamma^3
+ 16.86221\gamma^4
+ 4.082607\gamma^5 + \gamma^6
}
{10630 + 674\gamma + 2467\gamma^2 + 303.2428 \gamma^3+164.6842\gamma^4 + 36.6434\gamma^5 + 3.9596\gamma^6 +
0.8983\gamma^7 +\frac{16}{\pi^4} \gamma^8}
\right)^{1/4}$$

to at least 8 significant figures. The relative error of this approximation does not exceed $22 \times 10^{-9}$.

== Decay of pulsation ==
At small (but still positive) values of $~u~$ and $~v~$, the pulsation decays slowly, and this decay can be described analytically. In the first approximation, the parameters $~u~$ and $~v~$ give additive contributions to the decay; the decay rate, as well as the amplitude and phase of the nonlinear oscillation, can be approximated with elementary functions in a manner similar to the period above. In describing the behavior of the idealized Toda oscillator, the error of such approximations is smaller than the differences between the ideal and its experimental realization as a self-pulsing laser at the optical bench. However, a self-pulsing laser shows qualitatively very similar behavior.

== Continuous limit ==
The Toda chain equations of motion, in the continuous limit in which the distance between neighbors goes to zero, become the Korteweg–de Vries equation (KdV) equation. Here the index labeling the particle in the chain becomes the new spatial coordinate.

In contrast, the Toda field theory is achieved by introducing a new spatial coordinate which is independent of the chain index label. This is done in a relativistically invariant way, so that time and space are treated on equal grounds. This means that the Toda field theory is not a continuous limit of the Toda chain.
