= Gain (laser) =

In laser physics, gain or amplification is a process where the medium transfers part of its energy to the emitted electromagnetic radiation, resulting in an increase in optical power. This is the basic principle of all lasers. Quantitatively, gain is a measure of the ability of a laser medium to increase optical power. However, overall a laser consumes energy.

== Definition ==
The gain can be defined as the derivative of logarithm of power $~P~$ as it passes through the medium. The factor by which an input beam is amplified by a medium is called the gain and is represented by G.

$$G = \frac{{\rm d}}{{\rm d}z}\ln(P)=\frac{ {\rm d}P /{\rm d} z}{P}$$

where $~z~$ is the coordinate in the direction of propagation. This equation neglects the effects of the transversal profile of the beam.

In the quasi-monochromatic paraxial approximation, the gain can be taken into account with the following equation

$$2ik\frac{\partial E}{\partial z}=
\Delta_{\perp}E +  2 \nu E + i G E$$,

where $~\nu~$ is variation of index of refraction (Which is supposed to be small),

$~E~$ is complex field, related to the physical electric field $~E_{\rm phys}~$ with relation $~E_{\rm phys}={\rm Re}\left( \vec e E \exp(ikz-i\omega t)\right)~$, where $~\vec e~$ is vector of polarization, $~k~$ is wavenumber, $~\omega~$ is frequency, $~\Delta_{\rm \perp}=\left( \frac{\partial ^2}{\partial x^2}+ \frac{\partial ^2}{\partial y^2} \right) ~$ is transversal Laplacian; $~ \rm Re ~$ means real part.

== Gain in quasi two-level system ==
In the simple quasi two-level system, the gain can be expressed in terms of populations $~N_1~$ and $~N_2~$ of lower and excited states:

$$~
G = \sigma_{\rm e}N_2 - \sigma_{\rm a}N_1
~$$

where $~ \sigma_{\rm e}~$ and $~ \sigma_{\rm a}~$ are effective emission and absorption cross-sections. In the case of non-pumped medium, the gain is negative.

Round-trip gain means gain multiplied by the length of propagation of the laser emission during a single round-trip. In the case of gain varying along the length, the round-trip gain can be expressed with integral $g=\int G {\rm d} z$. This definition assumes either flat-top profile of the laser beam inside the laser, or some effective gain, averaged across the beam cross-section.

The amplification coefficient $~K~$ can be defined as ratio of the output power $~ P_{\rm out}$ to the input power $~P_{\rm in}$:

$$~ K=P_{\rm out}/P_{\rm in}$$.

It is related with gain; $~K=\exp\left(\int G {\rm d} z\right)~$.

The gain and the amplification coefficient should not be confused with the magnification coefficient. The magnification characterizes the scale of enlarging of an image; such enlargement can be realized with passive elements, without gain medium.

== Alternative terminology and notations ==
There is no established terminology about gain and absorption. Everyone is free to use own notations, and it is not possible to cover all the systems of notations in this article.

In radiophysics, gain may mean logarithm of the amplification coefficient.

In many articles on laser physics, which do not use the amplification coefficient $~K~$ defined above, the gain is called Amplification coefficient, in analogy with Absorption coefficient, which is actually not a coefficient at all; one has to multiply it to the length of propagation (thickness), change the signum, take inverse of the exponential, and only then get the coefficient of attenuation of the sample.

Some publications use term increment instead of gain and decrement instead of absorption coefficient to avoid the ambiguity, exploiting the analogy between paraxial propagation of quasi-monochromatic waves and time evolution of a dynamic system.

== See also ==
- Round-trip gain, gain multiplied by the length of propagation of the laser emission during a single round-trip
- Disk laser
- Effective cross-sections
- McCumber relation
