= Fiber laser =

Laser using an optical fiber as the active gain medium

A fiber laser (or fibre laser in Commonwealth English) is a laser in which the active gain medium is an optical fiber doped with rare-earth elements such as erbium, ytterbium, neodymium, dysprosium, praseodymium, thulium and holmium. They are related to doped fiber amplifiers, which provide light amplification without lasing.

Fiber nonlinearities, such as stimulated Raman scattering or four-wave mixing, can also provide gain and thus serve as gain media for a fiber laser.

== Characteristics ==
An advantage of fiber lasers over other types of lasers is that the laser light is both generated and delivered by an inherently flexible medium, which allows easier delivery to the focusing location and target. This can be important for laser cutting, welding, and folding of metals and polymers. Another advantage is high output power compared to other types of laser. Fiber lasers can have active regions several kilometers long, and so can provide very high optical gain. They can support kilowatt levels of continuous output power because of the fiber's high surface area to volume ratio, which allows efficient cooling. The fiber's waveguide properties reduce or eliminate thermal distortion of the optical path, typically producing a diffraction-limited, high-quality optical beam. Fiber lasers are compact compared to solid-state or gas lasers of comparable power, because the fiber can be bent and coiled, except in the case of thicker rod-type designs, to save space. They have lower cost of ownership. Fiber lasers are reliable and exhibit high temperature and vibrational stability and extended lifetime. High peak power and nanosecond pulses improve marking and engraving. The additional power and better beam quality provide cleaner cut edges and faster cutting speeds.

== Design and manufacture ==
Unlike most other types of lasers, the laser cavity in fiber lasers is constructed monolithically by fusion splicing different types of fiber; fiber Bragg gratings replace conventional dielectric mirrors to provide optical feedback. They may also be designed for single longitudinal mode operation of ultra-narrow distributed feedback lasers (DFB) where a phase-shifted Bragg grating overlaps the gain medium. Fiber lasers are pumped by semiconductor laser diodes or by other fiber lasers.

=== Double-clad fiber ===
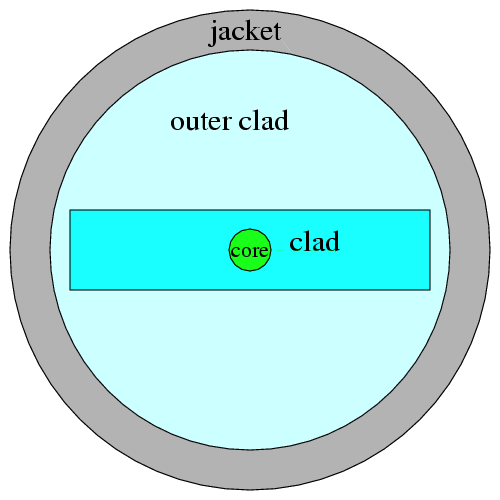
Double-clad fiber

Many high-power fiber lasers are based on double-clad fiber. The gain medium forms the core of the fiber, which is surrounded by two layers of cladding. The lasing mode propagates in the core, while a multimode pump beam propagates in the inner cladding layer. The outer cladding keeps this pump light confined. This arrangement allows the core to be pumped with a much higher-power beam than could otherwise be made to propagate in it, and allows the conversion of pump light with relatively low brightness into a much higher-brightness signal. There is an important question about the shape of the double-clad fiber; a fiber with circular symmetry seems to be the worst possible design. The design should allow the core to be small enough to support only a few (or even one) modes. It should provide sufficient cladding to confine the core and optical pump section over a relatively short piece of the fiber.

Tapered double-clad fiber (T-DCF) has tapered core and cladding which enables power scaling of amplifiers and lasers without thermal lensing mode instability.

=== Power scaling ===
Recent developments in fiber laser technology have led to a rapid and large rise in achieved diffraction-limited beam powers from diode-pumped solid-state lasers. Due to the introduction of large mode area (LMA) fibers as well as continuing advances in high power and high brightness diodes, continuous-wave single-transverse-mode powers from Yb-doped fiber lasers have increased from 100 W in 2001 to a combined beam fiber laser demonstrated power of 30 kW in 2014.

High average power fiber lasers generally consist of a relatively low-power master oscillator, or seed laser, and power amplifier (MOPA) scheme. In amplifiers for ultrashort optical pulses, the optical peak intensities can become very high, so that detrimental nonlinear pulse distortion or even destruction of the gain medium or other optical elements may occur. This is generally avoided by employing chirped-pulse amplification (CPA). State of the art high-power fiber laser technologies using rod-type amplifiers have reached 1 kW with 260 fs pulses and made outstanding progress and delivered practical solutions for the most of these problems.

However, despite the attractive characteristics of fiber lasers, several problems arise when power scaling. The most significant are thermal lensing and material resistance, nonlinear effects such as stimulated Raman scattering (SRS), stimulated Brillouin scattering (SBS), mode instabilities, and poor output beam quality.

The main approach to solving the problems related to increasing the output power of pulses has been to increase the core diameter of the fiber. Special active fibers with large modes were developed to increase the surface-to-active-volume ratio of active fibers and, hence, improve heat dissipation enabling power scaling.

Moreover, specially developed double cladding structures have been used to reduce the brightness requirements of the high-power pump diodes by controlling pump propagation and absorption between the inner cladding and the core.

Several types of active fibers with a large effective mode area (LMA) have been developed for high power scaling including LMA fibers with a low-aperture core, micro-structured rod-type fiber helical core or chirally coupled fibers, and tapered double-clad fibers (T-DCF). The mode field diameter (MFD) achieved with these low aperture technologies usually does not exceed 20–30 μm. The micro-structured rod-type fiber has much larger MFD (up to 65 μm) and good performance. An impressive 2.2 mJ pulse energy was demonstrated by a femtosecond MOPA containing large-pitch fibers (LPF). However, the shortcoming of amplification systems with LPF is their relatively long (up to 1.2 m) unbendable rod-type fibers meaning a rather bulky and cumbersome optical scheme. LPF fabrication is highly complex requiring significant processing such as precision drilling of the fiber pre-forms. The LPF fibers are highly sensitive to bending meaning robustness and portability is compromised.

=== Mode locking ===
In addition to the types of mode locking used with other lasers, fiber lasers can be passively mode locked by using the birefringence of the fiber itself. The non-linear optical Kerr effect causes a change in polarization that varies with the light's intensity. This allows a polarizer in the laser cavity to act as a saturable absorber, blocking low-intensity light but allowing high intensity light to pass with little attenuation. This allows the laser to form mode-locked pulses, and then the non-linearity of the fiber further shapes each pulse into an ultra-short optical soliton pulse.

Semiconductor saturable-absorber mirrors (SESAMs) can also be used to mode lock fiber lasers. A major advantage SESAMs have over other saturable absorber techniques is that absorber parameters can be easily tailored to meet the needs of a particular laser design. For example, saturation fluence can be controlled by varying the reflectivity of the top reflector while modulation depth and recovery time can be tailored by changing the low temperature growing conditions for the absorber layers. This freedom of design has further extended the application of SESAMs into modelocking of fiber lasers where a relatively high modulation depth is needed to ensure self-starting and operation stability. Fiber lasers working at 1 μm and 1.5 μm were successfully demonstrated.

Graphene saturable absorbers have also been used for mode locking fiber lasers. Graphene's saturable absorption is not very sensitive to wavelength, making it useful for mode locking tunable lasers.

=== Dark solitons ===
In the non-mode locking regime, a dark soliton fiber laser was successfully created using an all-normal dispersion erbium-doped fiber laser with a polarizer in-cavity. Experimental findings indicate that apart from the bright pulse emission, under appropriate conditions the fiber laser could also emit single or multiple dark pulses. Based on numerical simulations the dark pulse formation in the laser may be a result of dark soliton shaping.

=== Multi-wavelength emission ===
Multi-wavelength emission in a fiber laser demonstrated simultaneous blue and green coherent light using ZBLAN optical fiber. The end-pumped laser was based on an upconversion optical gain media using a longer wavelength semiconductor laser to pump a Pr3+/Yb3+ doped fluoride fiber that used coated dielectric mirrors on each end of the fiber to form the cavity.

== Fiber disk lasers ==
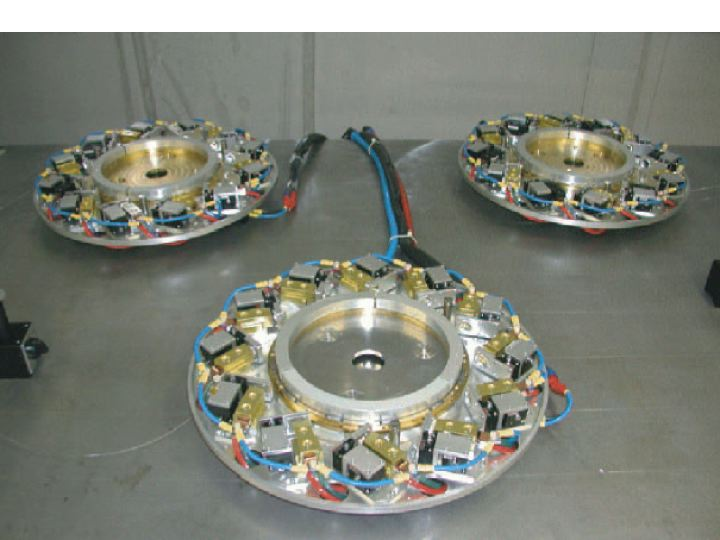
Three fiber disk lasers

Another type of fiber laser is the fiber disk laser. In such lasers, the pump is not confined within the cladding of the fiber, but instead pump light is delivered across the core multiple times because it is coiled in on itself. This configuration is suitable for power scaling in which many pump sources are used around the periphery of the coil.

== Applications ==
Applications of fiber lasers include material processing, telecommunications, spectroscopy, medicine, and directed energy weapons.

== See also ==
- Figure-8 laser
