= Optical amplifier =

Device that amplifies an optical signal

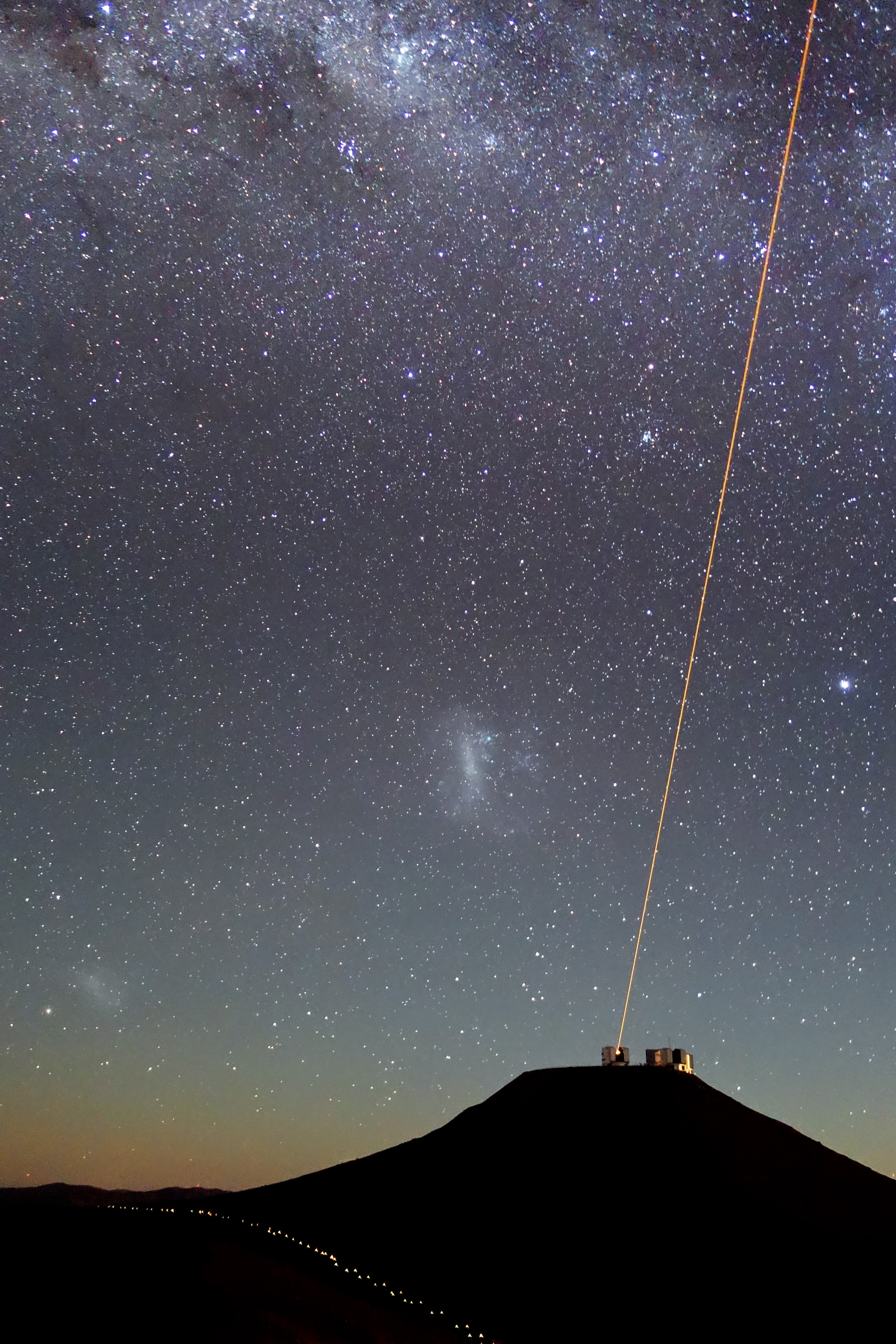
Optical amplifiers are used to create laser guide stars which provide feedback to the adaptive optics control systems which dynamically adjust the shape of the mirrors in the largest astronomical telescopes.

An optical amplifier is a device that amplifies an optical signal directly, without the need to first convert it to an electrical signal. An optical amplifier may be thought of as a laser without an optical cavity, or one in which feedback from the cavity is suppressed. Optical amplifiers are important in optical communication and laser physics. They are used as optical repeaters in the long distance fiber-optic cables which carry much of the world's telecommunication links.

There are several different physical mechanisms that can be used to amplify a light signal, which correspond to the major types of optical amplifiers. In doped fiber amplifiers and bulk lasers, stimulated emission in the amplifier's gain medium causes amplification of incoming light. In semiconductor optical amplifiers (SOAs), electron–hole recombination occurs. In Raman amplifiers, Raman scattering of incoming light with phonons in the lattice of the gain medium produces photons coherent with the incoming photons. Parametric amplifiers use parametric amplification.

== History ==
The principle of optical amplification was invented by Gordon Gould on November 13, 1957. He filed US Patent US80453959A on April 6, 1959, titled "Light Amplifiers Employing Collisions to Produce Population Inversions" (subsequently amended as a continuation in part and finally issued as U.S. patent 4,746,201A on May 4, 1988). The patent covered “the amplification of light by the stimulated emission of photons from ions, atoms or molecules in gaseous, liquid or solid state.” In total, Gould obtained 48 patents related to the optical amplifier that covered 80% of the lasers on the market at the time of issuance.

Gould co-founded an optical telecommunications equipment firm, Optelecom Inc., and with David Huber and Steve Alexander, invented the dual-stage optical amplifier that was part of the first dense wave division multiplexing (DWDM) system released in June 1996. This marked the start of optical networking. Optical amplification WDM systems are the common basis of all local, metro, national, intercontinental and subsea telecommunications networks.

== Laser amplifiers ==
Almost any laser active gain medium can be pumped to produce gain for light at the wavelength of a laser made with the same material as its gain medium. Such amplifiers are commonly used to produce high power laser systems. Special types such as regenerative amplifiers and chirped-pulse amplifiers are used to amplify ultrashort pulses.

=== Solid-state amplifiers ===
Solid-state amplifiers are optical amplifiers that use a wide range of doped solid-state materials (Nd: Yb:YAG, Ti:Sa) and different geometries (disk, slab, rod) to amplify optical signals. The variety of materials allows the amplification of different wavelengths, while the shape of the medium can distinguish between those more suitable for energy or average power scaling. Beside their use in fundamental research from gravitational wave detection to high energy physics at the National Ignition Facility they can also be found in many of today's ultra short pulsed lasers.

=== Doped-fiber amplifiers ===
Schematic diagram of a simple doped-fiber amplifier

Doped-fiber amplifiers (DFAs) are optical amplifiers that use a doped optical fiber as a gain medium to amplify an optical signal. They are related to fiber lasers. The signal to be amplified and a pump laser are multiplexed into the doped fiber, and the signal is amplified through interaction with the doping ions.

Amplification is achieved by stimulated emission of photons from dopant ions in the doped fiber. The pump laser excites ions into a higher energy from where they can decay via stimulated emission of a photon at the signal wavelength back to a lower energy level. The excited ions can also decay spontaneously (spontaneous emission) or even through nonradiative processes involving interactions with phonons of the glass matrix. These last two decay mechanisms compete with stimulated emission reducing the efficiency of light amplification.

The amplification window of an optical amplifier is the range of optical wavelengths for which the amplifier yields a usable gain. The amplification window is determined by the spectroscopic properties of the dopant ions, the glass structure of the optical fiber, and the wavelength and power of the pump laser.

Although the electronic transitions of an isolated ion are very well defined, broadening of the energy levels occurs when the ions are incorporated into the glass of the optical fiber and thus the amplification window is also broadened. This broadening is both homogeneous (all ions exhibit the same broadened spectrum) and inhomogeneous (different ions in different glass locations exhibit different spectra). Homogeneous broadening arises from the interactions with phonons of the glass, while inhomogeneous broadening is caused by differences in the glass sites where different ions are hosted. Different sites expose ions to different local electric fields, which shifts the energy levels via the Stark effect. In addition, the Stark effect also removes the degeneracy of energy states having the same total angular momentum (specified by the quantum number J). Thus, for example, the trivalent erbium ion (Er^{3+}) has a ground state with J = 15/2, and in the presence of an electric field splits into J + 1/2 = 8 sublevels with slightly different energies. The first excited state has J = 13/2 and therefore a Stark manifold with 7 sublevels. Transitions from the J = 13/2 excited state to the J= 15/2 ground state are responsible for the gain at 1500 nm wavelength. The gain spectrum of the EDFA has several peaks that are smeared by the above broadening mechanisms. The net result is a very broad spectrum (30 nm in silica, typically). The broad gain-bandwidth of fiber amplifiers make them particularly useful in wavelength-division multiplexed communications systems as a single amplifier can be utilized to amplify all signals being carried on a fiber and whose wavelengths fall within the gain window.

An erbium-doped waveguide amplifier (EDWA) is an optical amplifier that uses a waveguide to boost an optical signal.

==== Basic principle of EDFA ====
A relatively high-powered beam of light known as the pump light is mixed with the amplified input signal using a coupler. The input signal and the pump light must be at significantly different wavelengths. The mixed light is guided into a section of fiber with erbium ions included in the core. This high-powered light beam excites the erbium ions to their higher-energy state. When the photons belonging to the signal at a different wavelength from the pump light meet the excited erbium ions, the erbium ions undergo stimulated emission and return to their lower-energy state.

A significant point is that the erbium gives up its energy in the form of additional photons which are exactly in the same phase, frequency, and direction as the signal being amplified. So the signal is amplified along its direction of travel only. This is not unusual – when an atom "lases" it always gives up its energy in the same direction and phase as the incoming light. Thus all of the additional signal power is guided in the same fiber mode as the incoming signal. The pump light can be sent into the fiber in the same direction (forward pumping) or opposite direction of the signal (backwards pumping). An optical isolator is usually placed at the output to prevent reflections returning from the attached fiber. Such reflections disrupt amplifier operation and in the extreme case can cause the amplifier to become a laser.

The erbium doped amplifier is a high gain amplifier.

==== Noise ====
The principal source of noise in DFAs is amplified spontaneous emission (ASE), which has a spectrum approximately the same as the gain spectrum of the amplifier. Noise figure in an ideal DFA is 3 dB, while practical amplifiers can have noise figure as large as 6–8 dB.

As well as decaying via stimulated emission, electrons in the upper energy level can also decay by spontaneous emission, which occurs at random, depending upon the glass structure and inversion level. Photons are emitted spontaneously in all directions, but a proportion of those will be emitted in a direction that falls within the numerical aperture of the fiber and are thus captured and guided by the fiber. Those photons captured may then interact with other dopant ions, and are thus amplified by stimulated emission. The initial spontaneous emission is therefore amplified in the same manner as the signals, hence the term amplified spontaneous emission. ASE is emitted by the amplifier in both the forward and reverse directions, but only the forward ASE is a direct concern to system performance since that noise will co-propagate with the signal to the receiver where it degrades system performance. Counter-propagating ASE can, however, lead to degradation of the amplifier's performance since the ASE can deplete the inversion level and thereby reduce the gain of the amplifier and increase the noise produced relative to the desired signal gain.

Noise figure can be analyzed in both the optical domain and in the electrical domain. In the optical domain, measurement of the ASE, the optical signal gain, and signal wavelength using an optical spectrum analyzer permits calculation of the noise figure. For the electrical measurement method, the detected photocurrent noise is evaluated with a low-noise electrical spectrum analyzer, which along with measurement of the amplifier gain permits a noise figure measurement. Generally, the optical technique provides a more simple method, though it is not inclusive of excess noise effects captured by the electrical method such multi-path interference (MPI) noise generation. In both methods, attention to effects such as the spontaneous emission accompanying the input signal are critical to accurate measurement of noise figure.

==== Gain saturation ====
Gain is achieved in a DFA due to population inversion of the dopant ions. The inversion level of a DFA is set, primarily, by the power of the pump wavelength and the power at the amplified wavelengths. As the signal power increases, or the pump power decreases, the inversion level will reduce and thereby the gain of the amplifier will be reduced. This effect is known as gain saturation – as the signal level increases, the amplifier saturates and cannot produce any more output power, and therefore the gain reduces. Saturation is also commonly known as gain compression.

To achieve optimum noise performance DFAs are operated under a significant amount of gain compression (10 dB typically), since that reduces the rate of spontaneous emission, thereby reducing ASE. Another advantage of operating the DFA in the gain saturation region is that small fluctuations in the input signal power are reduced in the output amplified signal: smaller input signal powers experience larger (less saturated) gain, while larger input powers see less gain.

The leading edge of the pulse is amplified, until the saturation energy of the gain medium is reached. In some condition, the width (FWHM) of the pulse is reduced.

==== Inhomogeneous broadening effects ====
Due to the inhomogeneous portion of the linewidth broadening of the dopant ions, the gain spectrum has an inhomogeneous component and gain saturation occurs, to a small extent, in an inhomogeneous manner. This effect is known as spectral hole burning because a high power signal at one wavelength can 'burn' a hole in the gain for wavelengths close to that signal by saturation of the inhomogeneously broadened ions. Spectral holes vary in width depending on the characteristics of the optical fiber in question and the power of the burning signal, but are typically less than 1 nm at the short wavelength end of the C-band, and a few nm at the long wavelength end of the C-band. The depth of the holes are very small, though, making it difficult to observe in practice.

==== Polarization effects ====
Although the DFA is essentially a polarization independent amplifier, a small proportion of the dopant ions interact preferentially with certain polarizations and a small dependence on the polarization of the input signal may occur (typically < 0.5 dB). This is called polarization dependent gain (PDG).

The absorption and emission cross sections of the ions can be modeled as ellipsoids with the major axes aligned at random in all directions in different glass sites. The random distribution of the orientation of the ellipsoids in a glass produces a macroscopically isotropic medium, but a strong pump laser induces an anisotropic distribution by selectively exciting those ions that are more aligned with the optical field vector of the pump. Also, those excited ions aligned with the signal field produce more stimulated emission. The change in gain is thus dependent on the alignment of the polarizations of the pump and signal lasers – i.e. whether the two lasers are interacting with the same sub-set of dopant ions or not. In an ideal doped fiber without birefringence, the PDG would be inconveniently large. Fortunately, in optical fibers small amounts of birefringence are always present and, furthermore, the fast and slow axes vary randomly along the fiber length. A typical DFA has several tens of meters, long enough to already show this randomness of the birefringence axes. These two combined effects (which in transmission fibers give rise to polarization mode dispersion) produce a misalignment of the relative polarizations of the signal and pump lasers along the fiber, thus tending to average out the PDG. The result is that PDG is very difficult to observe in a single amplifier (but is noticeable in links with several cascaded amplifiers).

=== Erbium-doped optical fiber amplifiers ===
The erbium-doped fiber amplifier (EDFA) is the most deployed fiber amplifier as its amplification window coincides with the third transmission window of silica-based optical fiber. The core of a silica fiber is doped with trivalent erbium ions (Er^{3+}) and can be efficiently pumped with a laser at or near wavelengths of 980 nm and 1480 nm, and gain is exhibited in the 1550 nm region. The EDFA amplification region varies from application to application and can be anywhere from a few nm up to ~80 nm. Typical use of EDFA in telecommunications calls for Conventional, or C-band amplifiers (from ~1525 nm to ~1565 nm) or Long, or L-band amplifiers (from ~1565 nm to ~1610 nm). Both of these bands can be amplified by EDFAs, but it is normal to use two different amplifiers, each optimized for one of the bands.

The principal difference between C- and L-band amplifiers is that a longer length of doped fiber is used in L-band amplifiers. The longer length of fiber allows a lower inversion level to be used, thereby giving emission at longer wavelengths (due to the band-structure of Erbium in silica) while still providing a useful amount of gain.

EDFAs have two commonly used pumping bands – 980 nm and 1480 nm. The 980 nm band has a higher absorption cross-section and is generally used where low-noise performance is required. The absorption band is relatively narrow and so wavelength stabilised laser sources are typically needed. The 1480 nm band has a lower, but broader, absorption cross-section and is generally used for higher power amplifiers. A combination of 980 nm and 1480 nm pumping is generally utilised in amplifiers.

Gain and lasing in erbium-doped fibers were first demonstrated in 1986–87 by two groups; one including David N. Payne, R. Mears, I.M Jauncey and L. Reekie, from the University of Southampton and one from AT&T Bell Laboratories, consisting of E. Desurvire, P. Becker, and J. Simpson. The dual-stage optical amplifier which enabled dense wave division multiplexing (DWDM) was invented by Stephen B. Alexander at Ciena Corporation.

=== Doped fiber amplifiers for other wavelength ranges ===
Thulium doped fiber amplifiers have been used in the S-band (1450–1490 nm) and Praseodymium doped amplifiers in the 1300 nm region. However, those regions have not seen any significant commercial use so far and so those amplifiers have not been the subject of as much development as the EDFA. However, Ytterbium doped fiber lasers and amplifiers, operating near 1 micrometre wavelength, have many applications in industrial processing of materials, as these devices can be made with extremely high output power (tens of kilowatts).

== Semiconductor optical amplifier ==
Semiconductor optical amplifiers (SOAs) are amplifiers which use a semiconductor to provide the gain medium. These amplifiers have a similar structure to Fabry–Pérot laser diodes but with anti-reflection design elements at the end faces. Recent designs include anti-reflective coatings and tilted wave guide and window regions which can reduce end face reflection to less than 0.001%. Since this creates a loss of power from the cavity which is greater than the gain, it prevents the amplifier from acting as a laser. Another type of SOA consists of two regions. One part has a structure of a Fabry-Pérot laser diode and the other has a tapered geometry in order to reduce the power density on the output facet.

Semiconductor optical amplifiers are typically made from group III-V compound semiconductors such as GaAs/AlGaAs, InP/InGaAs, InP/InGaAsP and InP/InAlGaAs, though any direct band gap semiconductors such as II-VI could conceivably be used. Such amplifiers are often used in telecommunication systems in the form of fiber-pigtailed components, operating at signal wavelengths between 850 nm and 1600 nm and generating gains of up to 30 dB.

The semiconductor optical amplifier is of small size and electrically pumped. It can be potentially less expensive than the EDFA and can be integrated with semiconductor lasers, modulators, etc. However, the performance is still not comparable with the EDFA. The SOA has higher noise, lower gain, moderate polarization dependence and high nonlinearity with fast transient time. The main advantage of SOA is that all four types of nonlinear operations (cross gain modulation, cross phase modulation, wavelength conversion and four wave mixing) can be conducted. Furthermore, SOA can be run with a low power laser. This originates from the short nanosecond or less upper state lifetime, so that the gain reacts rapidly to changes of pump or signal power and the changes of gain also cause phase changes which can distort the signals. This nonlinearity presents the most severe problem for optical communication applications. However it provides the possibility for gain in different wavelength regions from the EDFA. "Linear optical amplifiers" using gain-clamping techniques have been developed.

High optical nonlinearity makes semiconductor amplifiers attractive for all optical signal processing like all-optical switching and wavelength conversion. There has been much research on semiconductor optical amplifiers as elements for optical signal processing, wavelength conversion, clock recovery, signal demultiplexing, and pattern recognition.

=== Vertical-cavity SOA ===
A recent addition to the SOA family is the vertical-cavity SOA (VCSOA). These devices are similar in structure to, and share many features with, vertical-cavity surface-emitting lasers (VCSELs). The major difference when comparing VCSOAs and VCSELs is the reduced mirror reflectivity used in the amplifier cavity. With VCSOAs, reduced feedback is necessary to prevent the device from reaching lasing threshold. Due to the extremely short cavity length, and correspondingly thin gain medium, these devices exhibit very low single-pass gain (typically on the order of a few percent) and also a very large free spectral range (FSR). The small single-pass gain requires relatively high mirror reflectivity to boost the total signal gain. In addition to boosting the total signal gain, the use of the resonant cavity structure results in a very narrow gain bandwidth; coupled with the large FSR of the optical cavity, this effectively limits operation of the VCSOA to single-channel amplification. Thus, VCSOAs can be seen as amplifying filters.

Given their vertical-cavity geometry, VCSOAs are resonant cavity optical amplifiers that operate with the input/output signal entering/exiting normal to the wafer surface. In addition to their small size, the surface normal operation of VCSOAs leads to a number of advantages, including low power consumption, low noise figure, polarization insensitive gain, and the ability to fabricate high fill factor two-dimensional arrays on a single semiconductor chip. These devices are still in the early stages of research, though promising preamplifier results have been demonstrated. Further extensions to VCSOA technology are the demonstration of wavelength tunable devices. These MEMS-tunable vertical-cavity SOAs utilize a microelectromechanical systems (MEMS) based tuning mechanism for wide and continuous tuning of the peak gain wavelength of the amplifier. SOAs have a more rapid gain response, which is in the order of 1 to 100 ps.

=== Tapered amplifiers ===
For high output power and broader wavelength range, tapered amplifiers are used. These amplifiers consist of a lateral single-mode section and a section with a tapered structure, where the laser light is amplified. The tapered structure leads to a reduction of the power density at the output facet.

Typical parameters:

- wavelength range: 633 to 1480 nm
- input power: 10 to 50 mW
- output power: up to 3 W

== Raman amplifier ==
In a Raman amplifier, the signal is intensified by Raman amplification. Unlike the EDFA and SOA the amplification effect is achieved by a nonlinear interaction between the signal and a pump laser within an optical fiber. There are two types of Raman amplifier: distributed and lumped. A distributed Raman amplifier is one in which the transmission fiber is utilised as the gain medium by multiplexing a pump wavelength with signal wavelength, while a lumped Raman amplifier utilises a dedicated, shorter length of fiber to provide amplification. In the case of a lumped Raman amplifier, a highly nonlinear fiber with a small core is utilised to increase the interaction between signal and pump wavelengths, and thereby reduce the length of fiber required.

The pump light may be coupled into the transmission fiber in the same direction as the signal (co-directional pumping), in the opposite direction (contra-directional pumping) or both. Contra-directional pumping is more common as the transfer of noise from the pump to the signal is reduced.

The pump power required for Raman amplification is higher than that required by the EDFA, with in excess of 500 mW being required to achieve useful levels of gain in a distributed amplifier. Lumped amplifiers, where the pump light can be safely contained to avoid safety implications of high optical powers, may use over 1 W of optical power.

The principal advantage of Raman amplification is its ability to provide distributed amplification within the transmission fiber, thereby increasing the length of spans between amplifier and regeneration sites. The amplification bandwidth of Raman amplifiers is defined by the pump wavelengths utilised and so amplification can be provided over wider, and different, regions than may be possible with other amplifier types which rely on dopants and device design to define the amplification 'window'.

Raman amplifiers have some fundamental advantages. First, Raman gain exists in every fiber, which provides a cost-effective means of upgrading from the terminal ends. Second, the gain is nonresonant, which means that gain is available over the entire transparency region of the fiber ranging from approximately 0.3 to 2 μm. A third advantage of Raman amplifiers is that the gain spectrum can be tailored by adjusting the pump wavelengths. For instance, multiple pump lines can be used to increase the optical bandwidth, and the pump distribution determines the gain flatness. Another advantage of Raman amplification is that it is a relatively broad-band amplifier with a bandwidth > 5 THz, and the gain is reasonably flat over a wide wavelength range.

However, a number of challenges for Raman amplifiers prevented their earlier adoption. First, compared to the EDFAs, Raman amplifiers have relatively poor pumping efficiency at lower signal powers. Although a disadvantage, this lack of pump efficiency also makes gain clamping easier in Raman amplifiers. Second, Raman amplifiers require a longer gain fiber. However, this disadvantage can be mitigated by combining gain and the dispersion compensation in a single fiber. A third disadvantage of Raman amplifiers is a fast response time, which gives rise to new sources of noise, as further discussed below. Finally, there are concerns of nonlinear penalty in the amplifier for the WDM signal channels.

Note: The text of an earlier version of this article was taken from the public domain Federal Standard 1037C.

== Optical parametric amplifier ==
An optical parametric amplifier allows the amplification of a weak signal-impulse in a nonlinear medium such as a noncentrosymmetric nonlinear medium (e.g. Beta barium borate (BBO)) or even a standard fused silica optical fiber via the Kerr effect. In contrast to the previously mentioned amplifiers, which are mostly used in telecommunication environments, this type finds its main application in expanding the frequency tunability of ultrafast solid-state lasers (e.g. Ti:sapphire). By using a noncollinear interaction geometry optical parametric amplifiers are capable of extremely broad amplification bandwidths.

== 21st century ==
In the 21st century high power fiber lasers were adopted as an industrial material processing tool, and were expanding into other markets including the medical and scientific markets. One key enhancement enabling penetration into the scientific market was improvement in high finesse fiber amplifiers, which became able to deliver single frequency linewidths (<5 kHz) together with excellent beam quality and stable linearly polarized output. Systems meeting these specifications steadily progressed from a few watts of output power initially, to tens of watts and later hundreds of watts. This power increase was achieved with developments in fiber technology, such as the adoption of stimulated brillouin scattering (SBS) suppression/mitigation techniques within the fiber, and improvements in overall amplifier design, including large mode area (LMA) fibers with a low-aperture core, micro-structured rod-type fiber helical core, or chirally coupled core fibers, and tapered double-clad fibers (T-DCF). As of 2015 high finesse, high power and pulsed fiber amplifiers delivered power levels exceeding those available from commercial solid-state single-frequency sources, and stable optimized performance, opening up new scientific applications.

== Implementations ==
There are several simulation tools that can be used to design optical amplifiers. Popular commercial tools have been developed by Optiwave Systems and VPI Systems.

== See also ==
- Nonlinear theory of semiconductor lasers
- Regenerative amplification
