= Laser medicine =

Application of laser in medical field

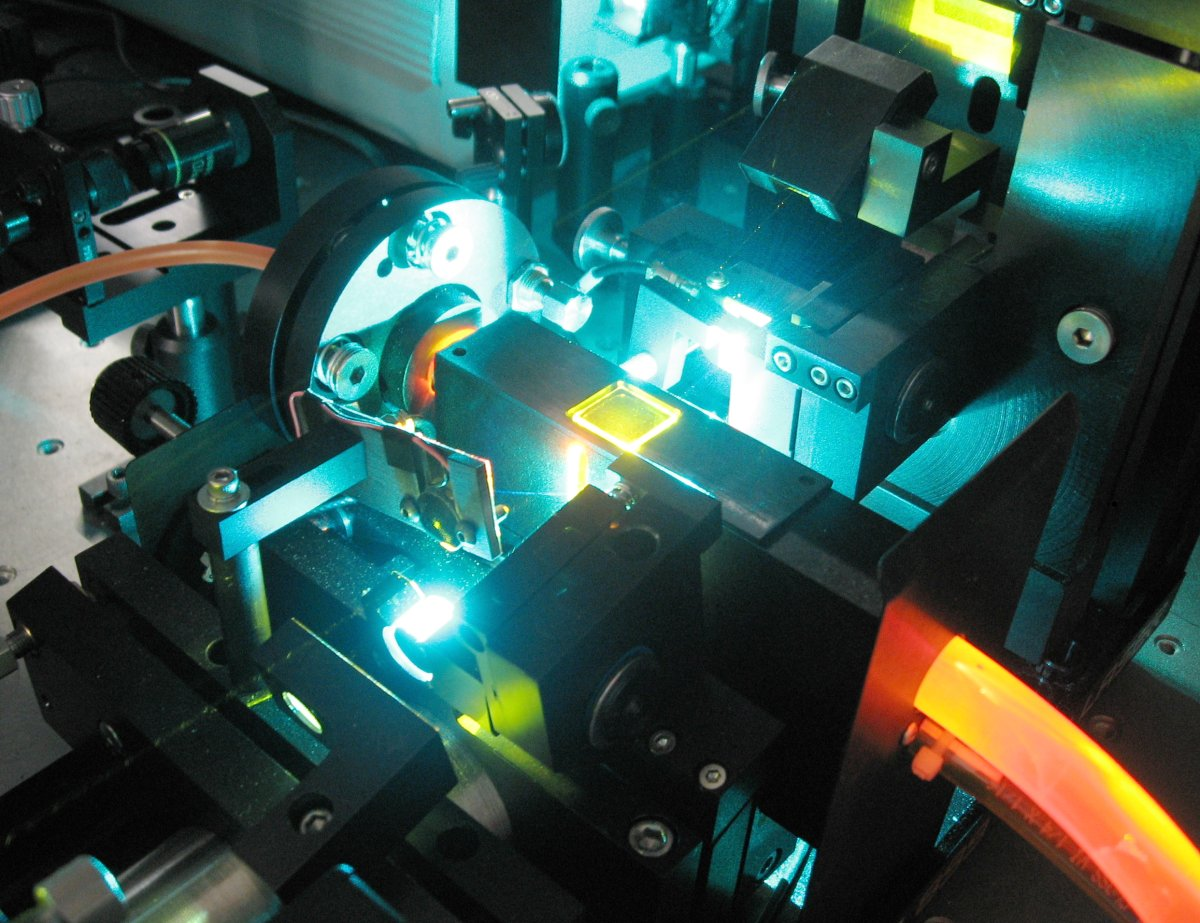
CW rhodamine dye laser emitting near 590 nm, one typically used in early medical laser systems.

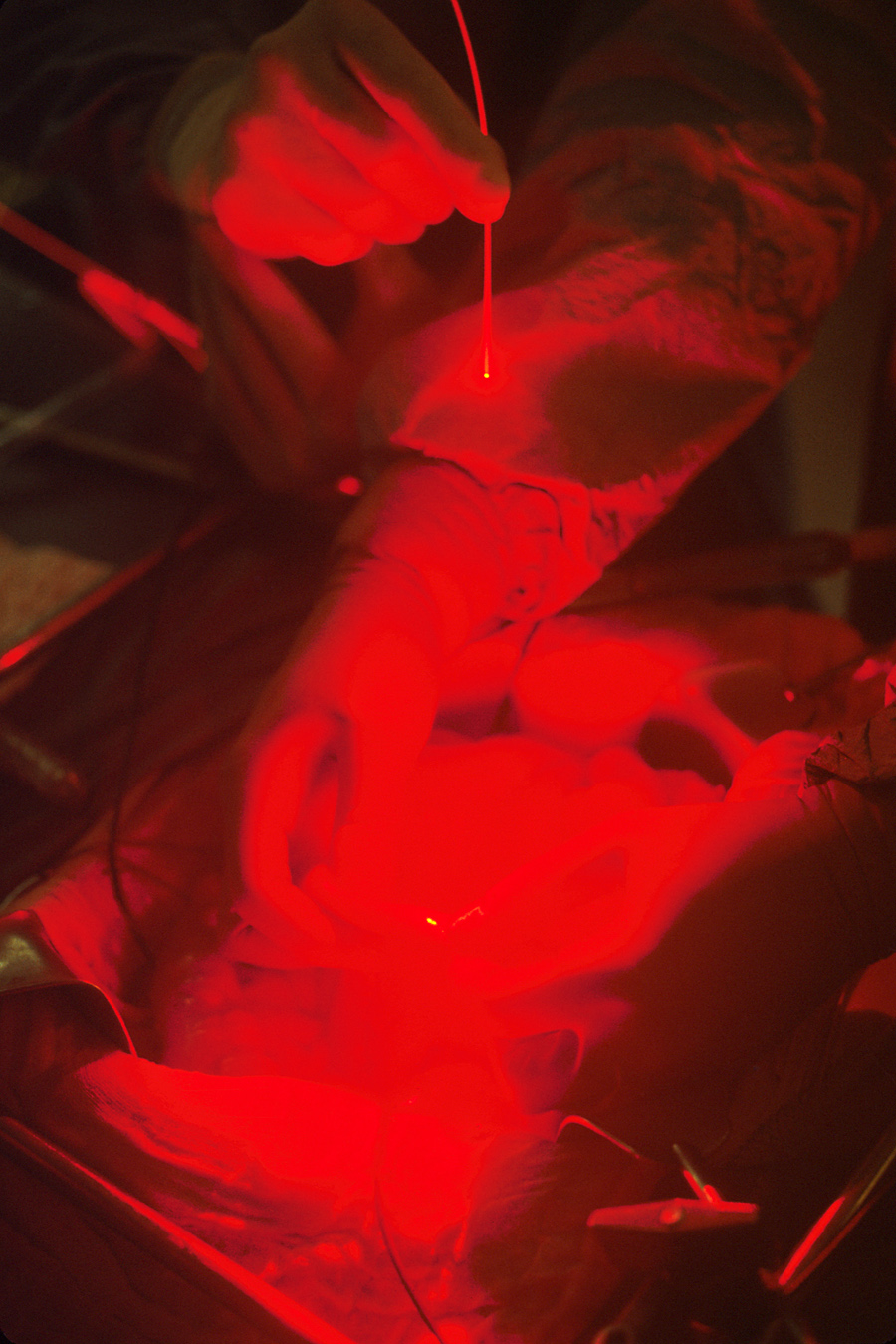
Laser radiation being delivered via a fiber for photodynamic therapy to treat cancer.

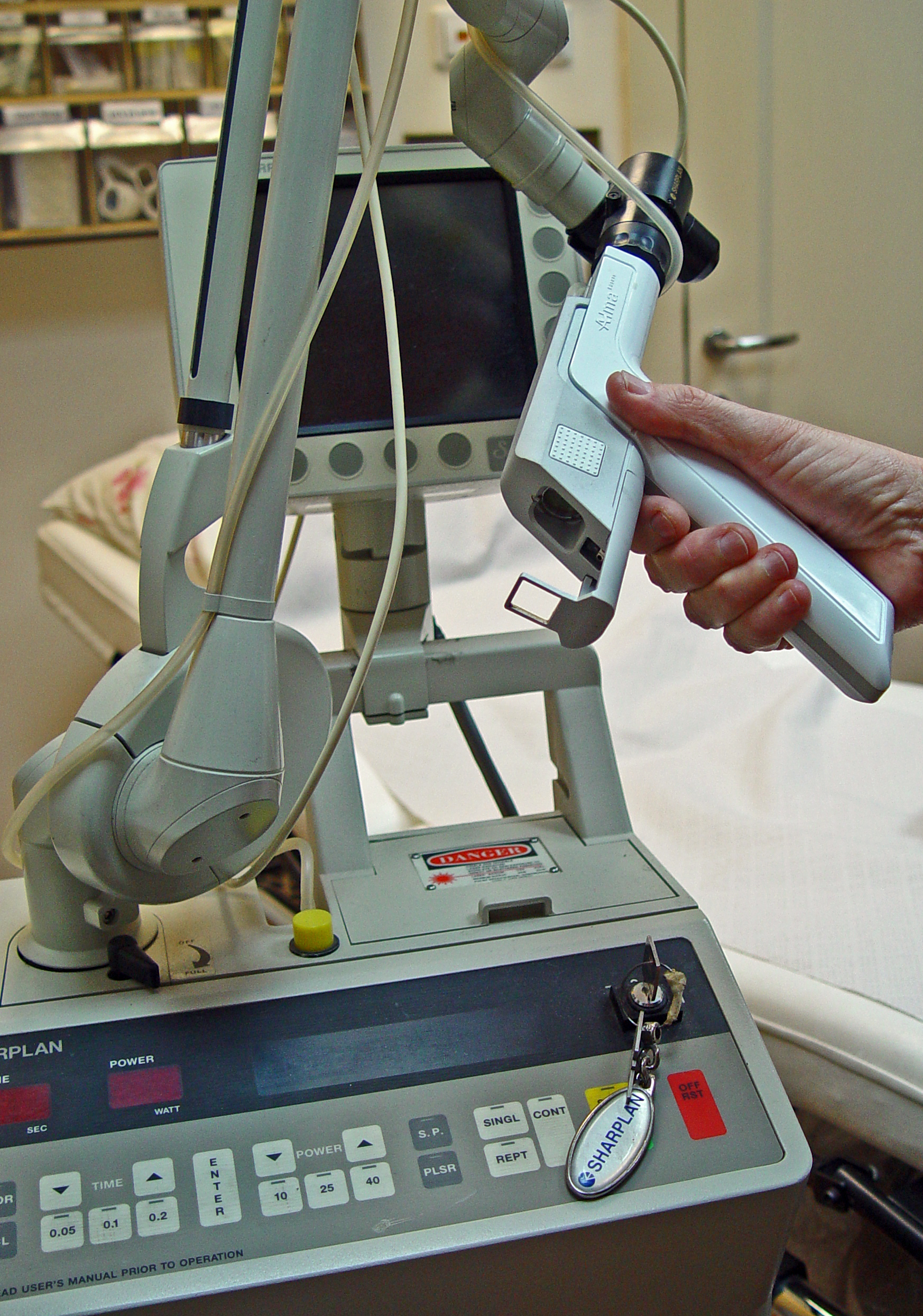
A 40-watt CO_{2} laser with applications in ENT, gynecology, dermatology, oral surgery, and podiatry

Laser medicine is the use of lasers in medical diagnosis, treatments, or therapies, such as laser photodynamic therapy, photorejuvenation, and laser surgery.

The word laser stands for "light amplification by stimulated emission of radiation".

== History ==
The laser was invented in 1960 by Theodore Maiman, and its potential uses in medicine were subsequently explored. Lasers benefit from three interesting characteristics: directivity (multiple directional functions), impulse (possibility of operating in very short pulses), and monochromaticity.

Several medical applications were found for this new instrument. In 1961, just one year after the laser's invention, Dr. Charles J. Campbell successfully used a ruby laser to destroy an angiomatous retinal tumor with a single pulse. In 1963, Dr. Leon Goldman used the ruby laser to treat pigmented skin cells and reported on his findings.

The argon-ionized laser (wavelength: 488–514 nm) has since become the preferred laser for the treatment of retinal detachment. The carbon dioxide laser was developed by Kumar Patel and others in the early 1960s and is now a common and versatile tool not only for medicinal purposes but also for welding and drilling, among other uses.

The possibility of using optical fiber (over a short distance in the operating room) since 1970 has opened many laser applications, in particular endocavitary, thanks to the possibility of introducing the fiber into the channel of an endoscope.

During this time, the argon laser began to be used in gastroenterology and pneumology. Dr. Peter Kiefhaber was the first to "successfully perform endoscopic argon laser photocoagulation for gastrointestinal bleeding in humans". Kiefhaber is also considered a pioneer in using the Nd:YAG laser in medicine, also using it to control gastrointestinal bleeding.

In 1976, Dr. Hofstetter employed lasers for the first time in urology. The late 1970s saw the rise of photodynamic therapy, thanks to laser dye. (Dougherty, 1972)

Since the early 1980s, applications have particularly developed, and lasers have become indispensable tools in ophthalmology, gastroenterology, and facial and aesthetic surgery.

In 1981, Goldman and Dr. Ellet Drake, along with others, founded the American Society for Laser Medicine and Surgery to mark the specialization of certain branches of medicine thanks to the laser. In the same year, the Francophone Society of Medical Lasers (in French, Société Francophone des Lasers Médicaux) was founded for the same purpose and was first led by Maurice Bruhat.

After the end of the 20th century, a number of centers dedicated to laser medicine opened, first in the OCDE, and then more generally since the beginning of the 21st century.

The Lindbergh Operation was a historic surgical operation between surgeons in New York (United States) and doctors and a patient in Strasbourg (France) in 2001. Among other things, they utilized lasers.

== Advantages ==
The laser presents multiple unique advantages that make it very popular among various practitioners.

- Due to its directional precision, a laser precisely cuts and cauterizes tissues without damaging neighboring cells. It's the safest technique and most precise cutting and cauterizing ever practiced in medicine.
- Laboratories use lasers extensively, especially for spectroscopy analysis and more generally for the analysis of biochemical samples. It makes it possible to literally "see" and more quickly determine the composition of a cell or sample on a microscopic scale.
- The electrical intensity of a laser is easily controllable in a safe way for the patient but also variable at will, which gives it a very wide and still partially explored range of uses (in 2021).

== Disadvantages ==
The principal disadvantage is not medical but rather economic: its cost. Although its price has dropped significantly in developed countries since its inception, it remains more expensive than most other common technical means due to materials, the technicality of the equipment necessary for the operation of any laser therapy, and the fact that it requires only certain specific training.

For example, in France (as in other countries with a social security system), dental, endodontal or periodontal laser treatment is classified outside the nomenclature and not reimbursed by social security.

== Lasers ==
Lasers used in medicine include, in principle, any type of laser, but especially the following:

- CO_{2} lasers, used to cut, vaporize, ablate, and photocoagulate soft tissue.
- diode lasers
- dye lasers
- excimer lasers
- fiber lasers
- gas lasers
- free electron lasers
- semiconductor diode lasers

== Applications in medicine ==
Examples of procedures, practices, devices, and specialties where lasers are utilized include the following:

- angioplasty
- cancer diagnosis
- cancer treatment
- dentistry
- cosmetic dermatology such as scar revision, skin resurfacing, laser hair removal, and tattoo removal
- dermatology, to treat melanoma
- frenectomy
- gingivectomy
- lithotripsy
- laser mammography
- medical imaging
- microscopy
- ophthalmology (includes Lasik and laser photocoagulation)
- optical coherence tomography
- optogenetics
- prostatectomy
- plastic surgery, in laser liposuction, in the treatment of skin lesions (congenital and acquired), and in scar management (burns and surgical scars)
- surgery, to cut, ablate, and cauterize tissue

== See also ==
- Dental laser
- Endovenous laser therapy
- Laser-assisted new attachment procedure
- Laser surgery
- Light therapy
- Low level laser therapy
- Neuromodulation
- Neurostimulation
- Photodynamic therapy
- Photomedicine
