= YAG laser =

YAG laser may refer to two types of lasers that use yttrium aluminum garnet (YAG):

- Nd:YAG laser (doped with neodymium)
- Er:YAG laser (doped with erbium)
