= Solid-state laser =

Laser which uses a solid gain medium

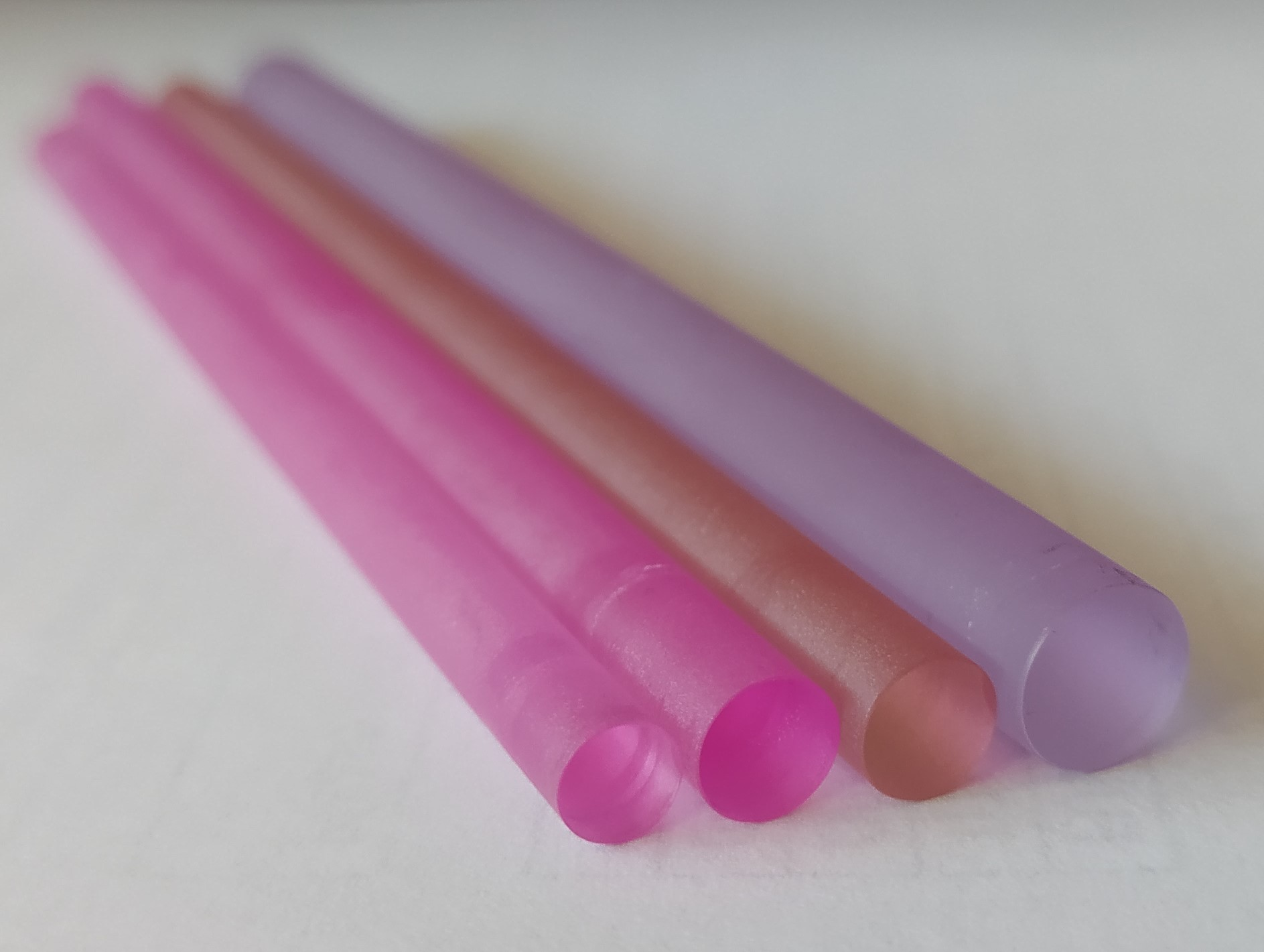
Laser rods (from left to right): Ruby, alexandrite, Er:YAG, Nd:YAG

A solid-state laser is a laser that uses a gain medium that is a solid, usually a crystal or glass. Semiconductor-based lasers such as laser diodes are generally excluded, treated as a separate class of laser.

== Solid-state media ==
Generally, the active medium of a solid-state laser consists of a glass or crystalline "host" material, to which is added a "dopant" such as neodymium, chromium, erbium, thulium, or ytterbium. Many of the common dopants are rare-earth elements, because the excited states of such ions are not strongly coupled with the thermal vibrations of their crystal lattices (phonons), and their operational thresholds can be reached at relatively low intensities of laser pumping.

There are many hundreds of solid-state media in which laser action has been achieved, but relatively few types are in widespread use. Of these, probably the most common is neodymium-doped yttrium aluminum garnet (Nd:YAG). Neodymium-doped glass (Nd:glass) and ytterbium-doped glasses or ceramics are used at very high power levels (terawatts) and high energies (megajoules), for multiple-beam inertial confinement fusion.

The first material used for lasers was synthetic ruby crystals. Ruby lasers are still used for a few applications, but they are no longer common because of their low power efficiencies. At room temperature, ruby lasers emit only short pulses of light, but at cryogenic temperatures they can be made to emit a continuous train of pulses.

The second solid-state gain medium was uranium-doped calcium fluoride. Peter Sorokin and Mirek Stevenson at IBM's laboratories in Yorktown Heights (US) experimented with this material in the 1960s and achieved lasing at 2.5 μm shortly after Maiman's ruby laser.

Some solid-state lasers can be made tunable by using intracavity etalons, prisms, gratings, or a combination of these. Titanium-doped sapphire is widely used for its broad tuning range, 660 to 1080 nanometers. Alexandrite lasers are tunable from 700 to 820 nm and yield higher-energy pulses than titanium-sapphire lasers because of the gain medium's longer energy storage time and higher damage threshold.

== Pumping ==
Solid state lasing media are typically optically pumped, using either a flashlamp or arc lamp, or by laser diodes. Diode-pumped solid-state lasers tend to be much more efficient and have become much more common as the cost of high-power semiconductor lasers has decreased.

== Mode locking ==
Mode locking of solid-state lasers and fiber lasers has wide applications as large-energy ultra-short pulses can be obtained. There are two types of saturable absorbers that are widely used as mode lockers: SESAM, and SWCNT. Graphene has also been used. These materials use a nonlinear optical behavior called saturable absorption to make a laser create short pulses.

== Applications ==
Solid state lasers are used in research, medical treatment, and military applications, among others. Passively Q-switched solid-state lasers prove useful for ranging, three-dimensional imaging, photoablation, and laser-induced breakdown spectroscopy.

== See also ==
- Disk laser
- Laser construction
- Solid-state dye lasers
