= Laser gingivectomy =

Dental procedure

Laser gingivectomy is a dental procedure that recontours the gingival tissue to improve long term dental health, aesthetics or uncover impacted/unerupted teeth. Compared to conventional scalpel surgery, soft-tissue dental lasers, such as laser diode, Nd:YAG laser, Er:YAG laser, Er,Cr:YSGG laser, and CO_{2} lasers, can perform this procedure, offering a precise, stable, bloodless, often less painful, and accelerated healing experience. However, the laser diode gained more popularity due to its versatility, less interaction with hard tissue, ease of use, and the less expensive set up.

== Medical uses ==
- Where a patient presents with an unsightly gummy smile due to too much gingival coverage of tooth crown, especially the upper front incisors
- Where there is overgrowth of the gum due to oral hygiene issues, drug usage, or hereditary medical condition. Sometimes overgrowth of the gum can be seen during orthodontic treatment with fixed braces.
- Surgical exposure of teeth with delayed eruption or superficially impacted teeth to facilitate orthodontic treatment and tooth eruption
