= Ruby laser =

Solid-state laser

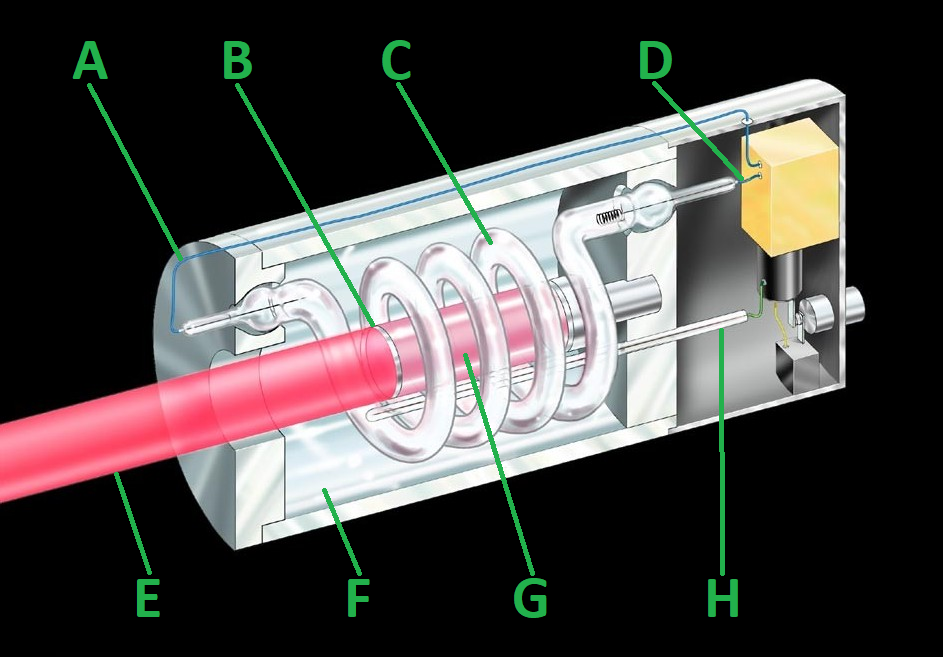
Diagram of the first ruby laser. A - Positive lead. B - Mirror coating. C - Xenon flashtube. D - Negative lead. E - Laser beam. F - Pumping cavity. G - Ruby rod. H - Trigger wire.

A ruby laser is a solid-state laser that uses a synthetic ruby crystal as its gain medium. The first working laser was a ruby laser made by Theodore H. Maiman at Hughes Research Laboratories on May 16, 1960.

Ruby lasers produce pulses of coherent visible light at a wavelength of 694.3 nm, which is a deep red color. Typical ruby laser pulse lengths are on the order of a millisecond.

== Design ==
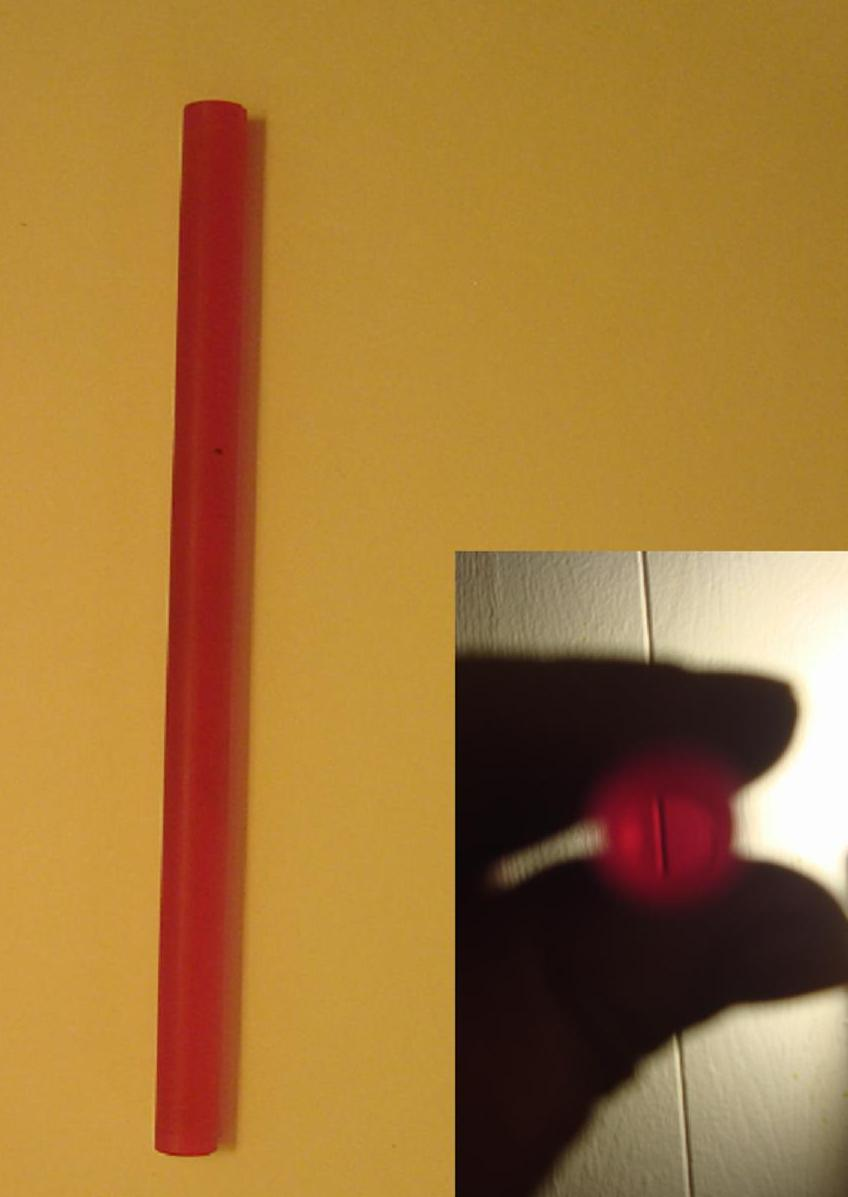
A ruby laser rod. Inset: The view through the rod is crystal clear.

A ruby laser most often consists of a ruby rod that must be pumped with very high energy, usually from a flashtube, to achieve a population inversion. The rod is often placed between two mirrors, forming an optical cavity, which oscillate the light produced by the ruby's fluorescence, causing stimulated emission. Ruby is one of the few solid state lasers that produce light in the visible range of the spectrum, lasing at 694.3 nanometers, in a deep red color, with a very narrow linewidth of 0.53 nm.

The ruby laser is a three-level solid state laser. The active laser medium (laser gain/amplification medium) is a synthetic ruby rod that is energized through optical pumping, typically by a xenon flashtube. Ruby has very broad and powerful absorption bands in the visual spectrum, at 400 and 550 nm, and a very long fluorescence lifetime of 3 milliseconds. This allows for very high energy pumping, since the pulse duration can be much longer than with other materials. While ruby has a very wide absorption profile, its conversion efficiency is much lower than other mediums.

In early examples, the rod's ends had to be polished with great precision, such that the ends of the rod were flat to within a quarter of a wavelength of the output light, and parallel to each other within a few seconds of arc. The finely polished ends of the rod were silvered; one end completely, the other only partially. The rod, with its reflective ends, then acts as a Fabry–Pérot etalon (or a Gires–Tournois etalon). Modern lasers often use rods with antireflection coatings, or with the ends cut and polished at Brewster's angle instead. This eliminates the reflections from the ends of the rod. External dielectric mirrors then are used to form the optical cavity. Curved mirrors are typically used to relax the alignment tolerances and to form a stable resonator, often compensating for thermal lensing of the rod.

Transmittance of ruby in optical and near-IR spectra. Note the two broad blue and green absorption bands and the narrow absorption band at 694 nm, which is the wavelength of the ruby laser.

Ruby also absorbs some of the light at its lasing wavelength. To overcome this absorption, the entire length of the rod needs to be pumped, leaving no shaded areas near the mountings. The active part of the ruby is the dopant, which consists of chromium ions suspended in a synthetic sapphire crystal. The dopant often comprises around only 0.05% of the crystal, but is responsible for all of the absorption and emission of radiation. Depending on the concentration of the dopant, synthetic ruby usually comes in either pink or red.

== Applications ==
One of the first applications for the ruby laser was in rangefinding. By 1964, ruby lasers with rotating prism q-switches became the standard for military rangefinders, until the introduction of more efficient Nd:YAG rangefinders a decade later. Ruby lasers were used mainly in research. The ruby laser was the first laser used to optically pump tunable dye lasers and is particularly well suited to excite laser dyes emitting in the near infrared. Ruby lasers are rarely used in industry, mainly due to low efficiency and low repetition rates. One of the main industrial uses is drilling holes through diamond, because ruby's high-powered beam closely matches diamond's broad absorption band (the GR1 band) in the red.

Ruby lasers have declined in use with the discovery of better lasing media. They are still used in a number of applications where short pulses of red light are required. Holographers around the world produce holographic portraits with ruby lasers, in sizes up to a meter square. Because of its high pulsed power and good coherence length, the red 694 nm laser light is preferred to the 532 nm green light of frequency-doubled Nd:YAG, which often requires multiple pulses for large holograms. Many non-destructive testing labs use ruby lasers to create holograms of large objects such as aircraft tires to look for weaknesses in the lining. Ruby lasers were used extensively in tattoo and hair removal, but are being replaced by alexandrite and Nd:YAG lasers in this application.

== History ==
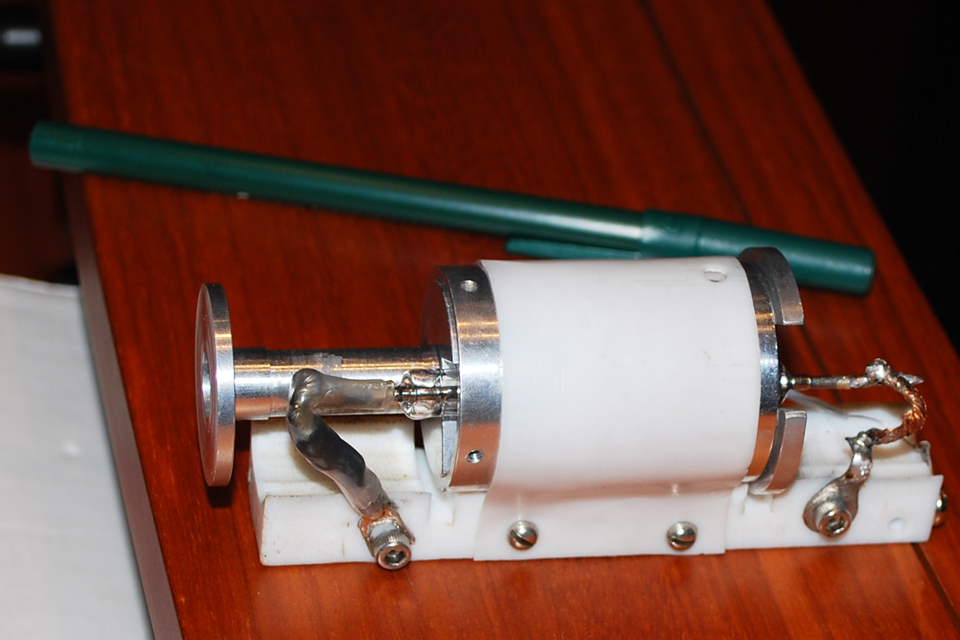
Maiman's original ruby laser

The ruby laser was the first laser to be made functional. Built by Theodore Maiman in 1960, the device was created out of the concept of an "optical maser," a maser that could operate in the visual or infrared regions of the spectrum.

In 1958, after the inventor of the maser, Charles Townes, and his colleague, Arthur Schawlow, published an article in the Physical Review regarding the idea of optical masers, the race to build a working model began. Ruby had been used successfully in masers, so it was a first choice as a possible medium. While attending a conference in 1959, Maiman listened to a speech given by Schawlow, describing the use of ruby as a lasing medium. Schawlow stated that pink ruby, having a lowest energy-state that was too close to the ground-state, would require too much pumping energy for laser operation, suggesting red ruby as a possible alternative. Maiman, having worked with ruby for many years, and having written a paper on ruby fluorescence, felt that Schawlow was being "too pessimistic." His measurements indicated that the lowest energy level of pink ruby could at least be partially depleted by pumping with a very intense light source, and, since ruby was readily available, he decided to try it anyway.

Also attending the conference was Gordon Gould. Gould suggested that, by pulsing the laser, peak outputs as high as a megawatt could be produced.

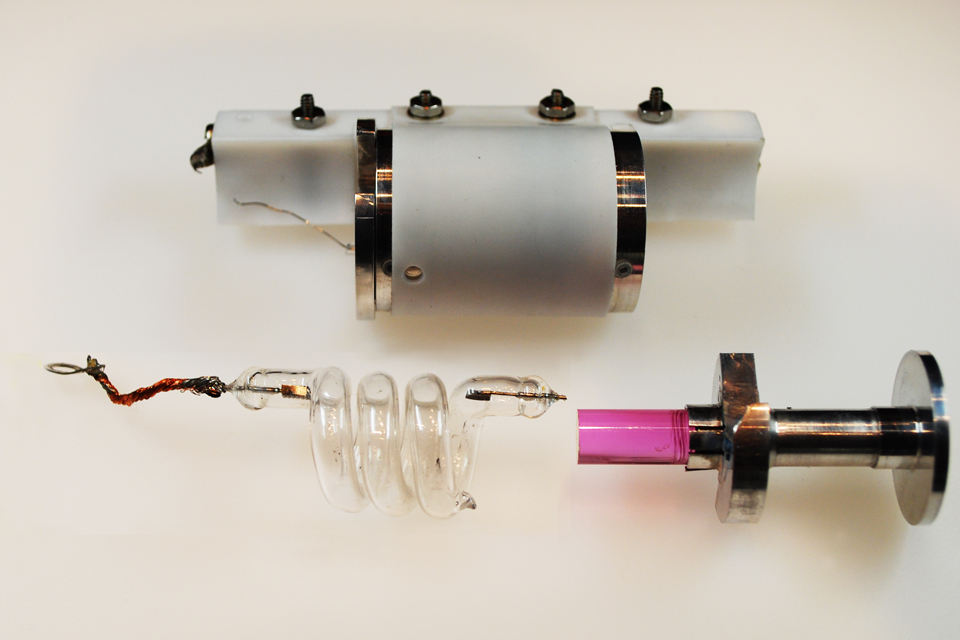
Components of original ruby laser

As time went on, many scientists began to doubt the usefulness of any color ruby as a laser medium. Maiman, too, felt his own doubts, but, being a very "single-minded person," he kept working on his project in secret. He searched to find a light source that would be intense enough to pump the rod, and an elliptical pumping cavity of high reflectivity, to direct the energy into the rod. He found his light source when a salesman from General Electric showed him a few xenon flashtubes, claiming that the largest could ignite steel wool if placed near the tube. Maiman realized that, with such intensity, he did not need such a highly reflective pumping cavity, and, with the helical lamp, would not need it to have an elliptical shape. Maiman constructed his ruby laser at Hughes Research Laboratories, in Malibu, California. He used a pink ruby rod, measuring 1 cm by 1.5 cm, and, on May 16, 1960, fired the device, producing the first beam of laser light.

Theodore Maiman's original ruby laser is still operational. It was demonstrated on May 15, 2010, at a symposium co-hosted in Vancouver, British Columbia by the Dr. Theodore Maiman Memorial Foundation and Simon Fraser University, where Dr. Maiman was adjunct professor at the School of Engineering Science. Maiman's original laser was fired at a projector screen in a darkened room. In the center of a white flash (leakage from the xenon flashtube), a red spot was briefly visible.

The ruby lasers did not deliver a single pulse, but rather delivered a series of pulses, consisting of a series of irregular spikes within the pulse duration. In 1961, Robert W. Hellwarth invented a method of q-switching, to concentrate the output into a single pulse.

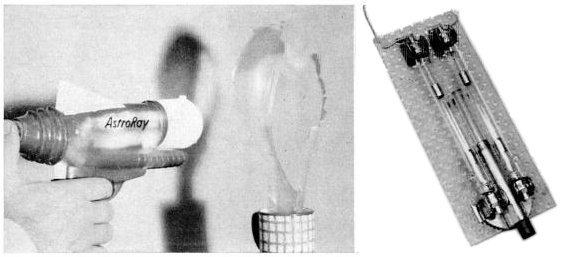
Ruby laser pistol constructed by Stanford Univ. physics professor in 1964 to demonstrate the laser to his classes. The plastic body recycled from a toy raygun contained a ruby rod between two flashtubes (right). The pulse of coherent red light was strong enough to pop blue balloons (shown at left) but not red balloons which reflected the light.

In 1962, Willard Boyle, working at Bell Labs, produced the first continuous output from a ruby laser. Unlike the usual side-pumping method, the light from a mercury arc lamp was pumped into the end of a very small rod, to achieve the necessary population inversion. The laser did not emit a continuous wave, but rather a continuous train of pulses, giving scientists the opportunity to study the spiked output of ruby. The continuous ruby laser was the first laser to be used in medicine. It was used by Leon Goldman, a pioneer in laser medicine, for treatments such as tattoo removal, scar treatments, and to induce healing. Due to its limits in output power, tunability, and complications in operating and cooling the units, the continuous ruby laser was quickly replaced with more versatile dye, Nd:YAG, and argon lasers.
