= Dental drill =

Dental instrument

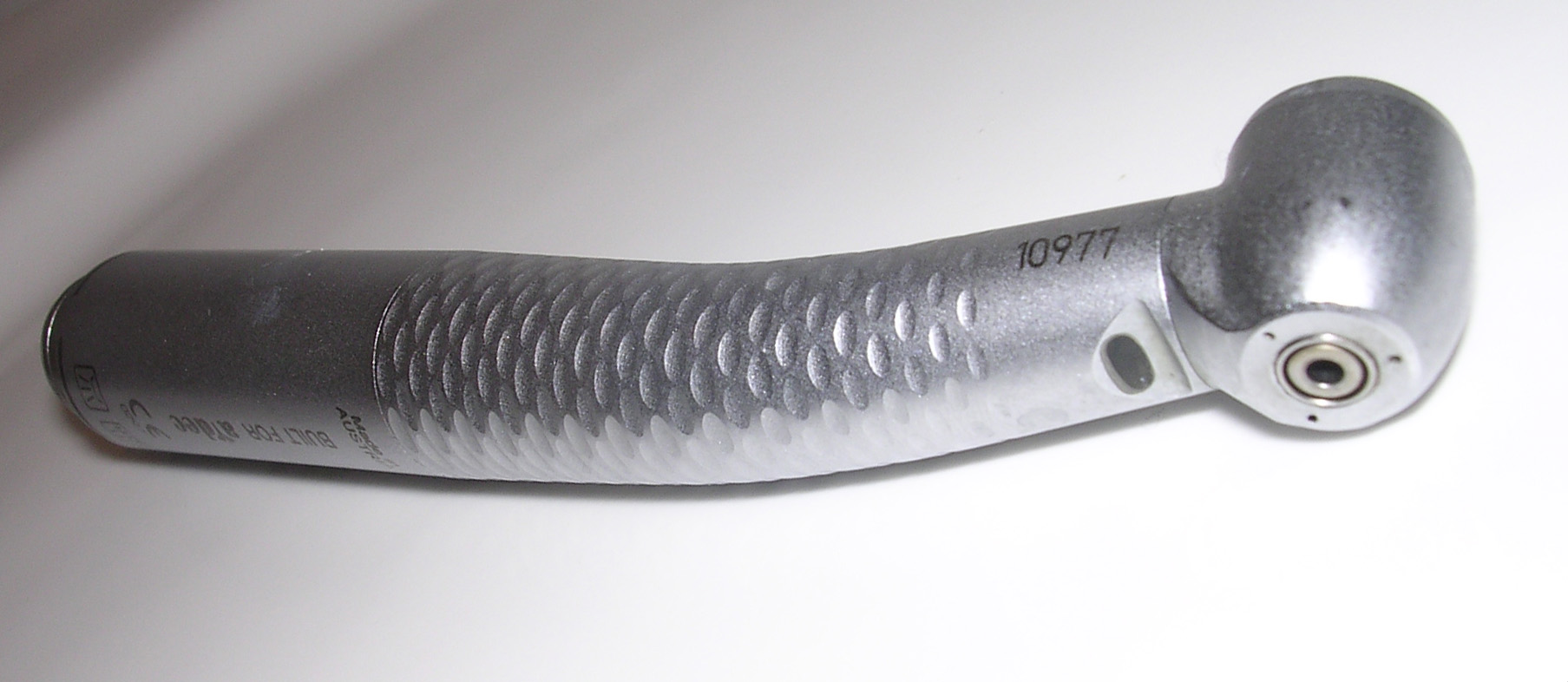
A high-speed dental handpiece

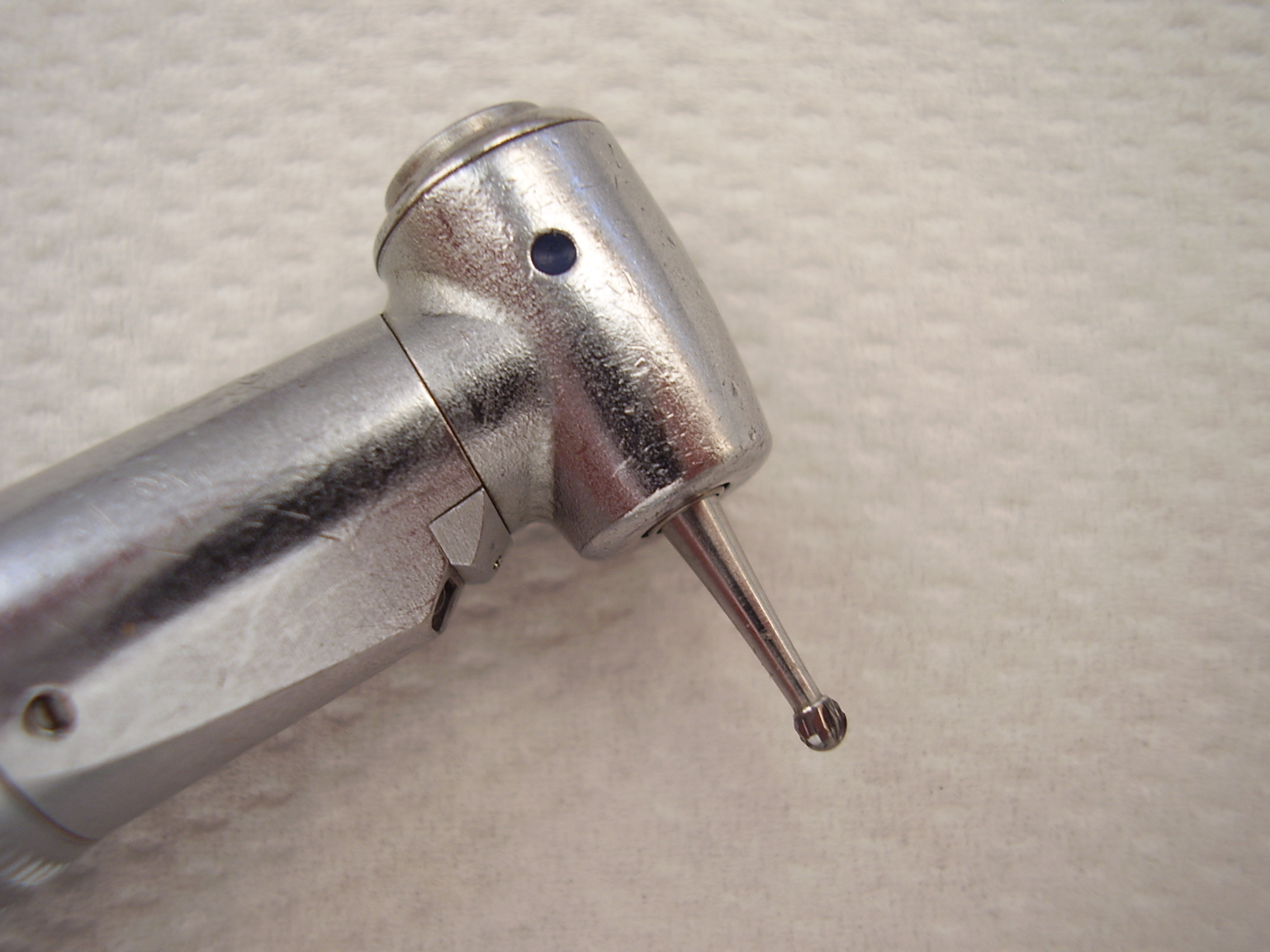
Head of the dental drill

A dental drill or dental handpiece is a hand-held, mechanical instrument used to perform a variety of common dental procedures, including removing decay, polishing fillings, performing cosmetic dentistry, and altering prostheses. The handpiece itself consists of internal mechanical components that initiate a rotational force and provide power to the cutting instrument, usually a dental burr.

The type of apparatus used clinically will vary depending on the required function dictated by the dental procedure. It is common for a light source and cooling water-spray system to also be incorporated into certain handpieces; this improves visibility, accuracy, and the overall success of the procedure. The burrs are usually made of tungsten carbide or diamond.

== High-speed handpiece ==
Depending on their mechanisms, handpieces are classified as air turbine or electric (including speed-increasing). However, in a clinical context, air turbine handpieces are commonly referred to as "high-speeds". Handpieces have a chuck or collet, for holding a cutter, called a burr or bur.

=== Mechanisms ===
==== Power ====
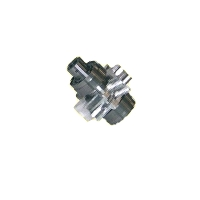
Air turbine used in a dental handpiece

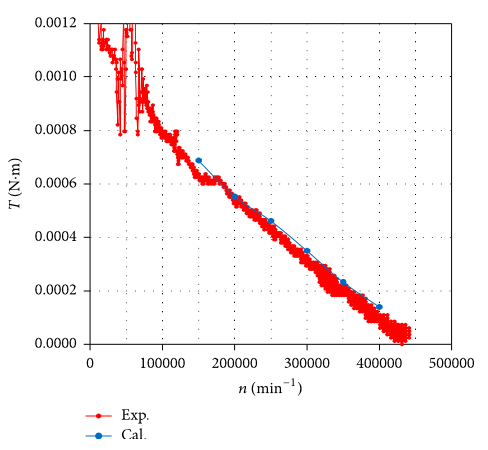
Correlation between rotational speed and torque

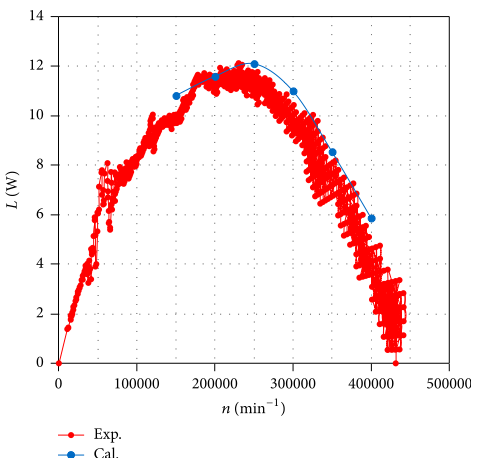
Correlation between rotational speed and turbine output power

The turbine is powered by compressed air between 35 and 61 pounds per square inch (~2,4 to 4,2 bar), which passes up the centre of the instrument and rotates a Pelton wheel in the head of the handpiece. The centre of the windmill (chuck) is surrounded by bearing housing, which holds a friction-grip burr firmly & centrally within the instrument. Inside the bearing housing are small, lubricated ball-bearings (stainless steel or ceramic), which allow the shank of the burr to rotate smoothly along a central axis with minimal friction. The complete rotor is fixed with O-rings in the head of the high speed. The O-Rings allow the system to become perfect centric during the idle speed but allow a small movement of the rotor within the head.

Failure of the burr to run centrally causes a number of clinical defects:

- The burr will judder; this will cause excessive, damaging vibrations leading to cracking and crazing in the material being cut. It is also an unpleasant experience for the patient.
- Eccentric cutting – this will result in irregular removal of the surface, meaning more tissue than necessary is removed.
- Decreased control – due to irregular cutting, it is more difficult for the dentist to control movements.

==== Cooling ====
High-speed friction generates tremendous heat within the burr. High-speed handpieces must consequently have an excellent water-cooling system. The standard is 50 ml/min of cooling water provided through 3 to 5 spray hole jets.

==== Illumination ====
Many modern handpieces now have a light in close proximity to the burr. The light is directed at the cutting surface as to assist with intra-operative vision.

Older handpieces utilized a system of halogen lamps and fiber-optic rods, but this method has several drawbacks: halogen bulbs decay over time and are costly to repair, and fiber-optic rods fracture readily if dropped and disintegrate through repeated autoclaving cycles.

LED technologies are now used in many sophisticated handpieces. LEDs have a longer operating life, produce more powerful light, and produce less heat.

== Electric handpiece ==
While air turbine-powered handpieces can reach extremely high speeds (between 250,000 and 420,000 rpm) with low torque, electric handpieces typically operate at lower speeds (20 to 200,000 rpm) with higher torque. Some electric handpieces, called speed-increasing handpieces, utilize gear ratios to boost their rotational speed.

- An electric handpiece is driven by a small electrical motor, also known as a micromotor.
- The power to the handpiece is provided by the micromotor.
- Within the handpiece are internal gearings that allow the friction grip burr to rotate at a constant speed, independent of torque.
- Therefore, the power is provided by a micromotor and internal gearings.

=== Torque ===
- Torque is the ability of the burr to continually rotate at the same speed and cut even when pressure is applied
- As the speed of a handpiece increases, its torque subsequently decreases (slow-speed handpieces have high torque, whereas high-speed handpieces, like the air turbine system, have a low torque)
- The free running speed of 1:5 gear ratio electric handpiece is the same as its cutting speed; thus, 40,000 motor speed x 5 = 200,000 rpm burr speed.
- The electrical motor maintains the 200,000 rpm speed and provides consistent power, so torque will be maintained, depending on the electronic control parameters.

== Comparison of air driven and electric handpieces ==
	Air driven	Electric
Type of burr used	Friction grip	Friction grip
Power source	Compressed air	Electric micromotor
Torque	Variable	Constant
Motion of burr	Rotation & Pecking	Rotation only
Balance	Usually neutral	Motor end heavy
Noise	Louder	Quieter

== Slow-speed handpiece ==
Slow-speed handpieces work at a much slower rate than high-speed electric or air turbine handpieces. Slow-speed handpieces are usually driven by rotary vane motors, instead of air turbines. They work at a speed between 600 and 25,000 rpm. The internal gearing is very similar to that of a speed-increasing handpiece. The main difference between the two is that slow speed has internal gearing, and they can use both a latch grip burr and a friction grip burr.

=== Indications for use ===
Generally used for operative procedures such as the removal of dental caries or for polishing enamel or restorative materials. A straight, slow-speed handpiece is generally indicated for the extra oral adjustment and polishing of acrylic and metal.

== Speed-decreasing handpiece ==
Designed to work at slower speeds.

=== Indications for use ===
The main indications for use include endodontic canal preparation, implant placement, and prophylaxis.

==== Endodontic canal preparation ====
Endodontic canals are prepared using a slow-rotating file. It is imperative that torque be controlled in order to prevent endodontic file separation during use.

- Implant placement - In order to prevent heat damage to the bone during implant placement, a speed decreasing handpiece is used.
- Prophylaxis - Prophylaxis with the use of a speed-decreasing handpiece ensures that less heat is produced and thus less risk of pulpal damage by heat transmission.

== Dental burr ==
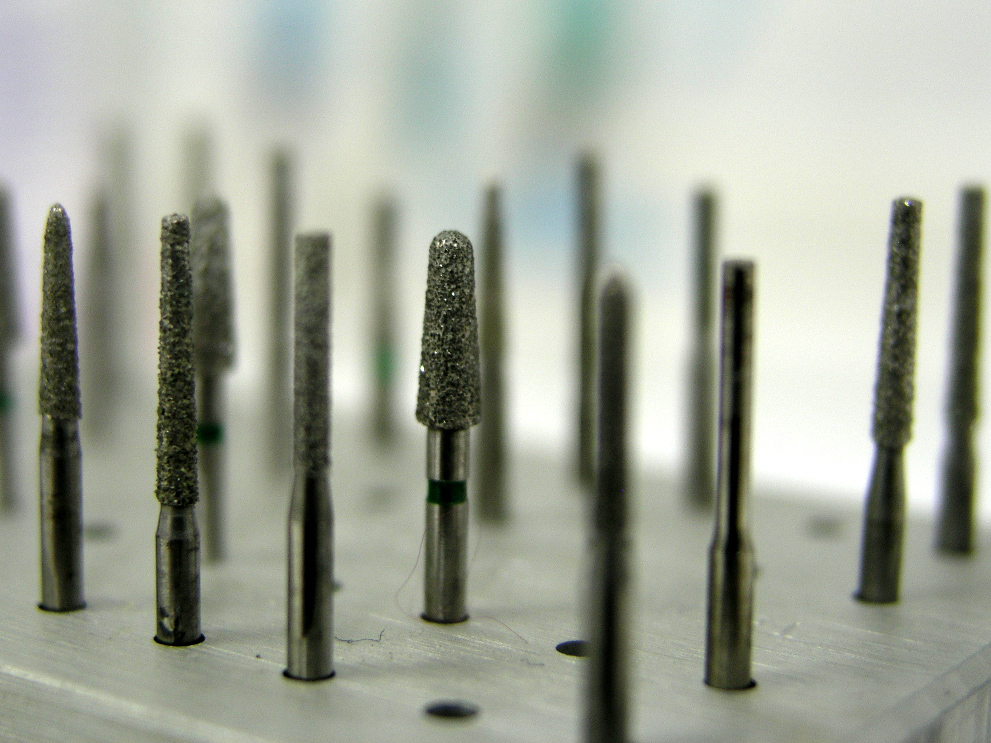
A collection of various burrs used in dentistry

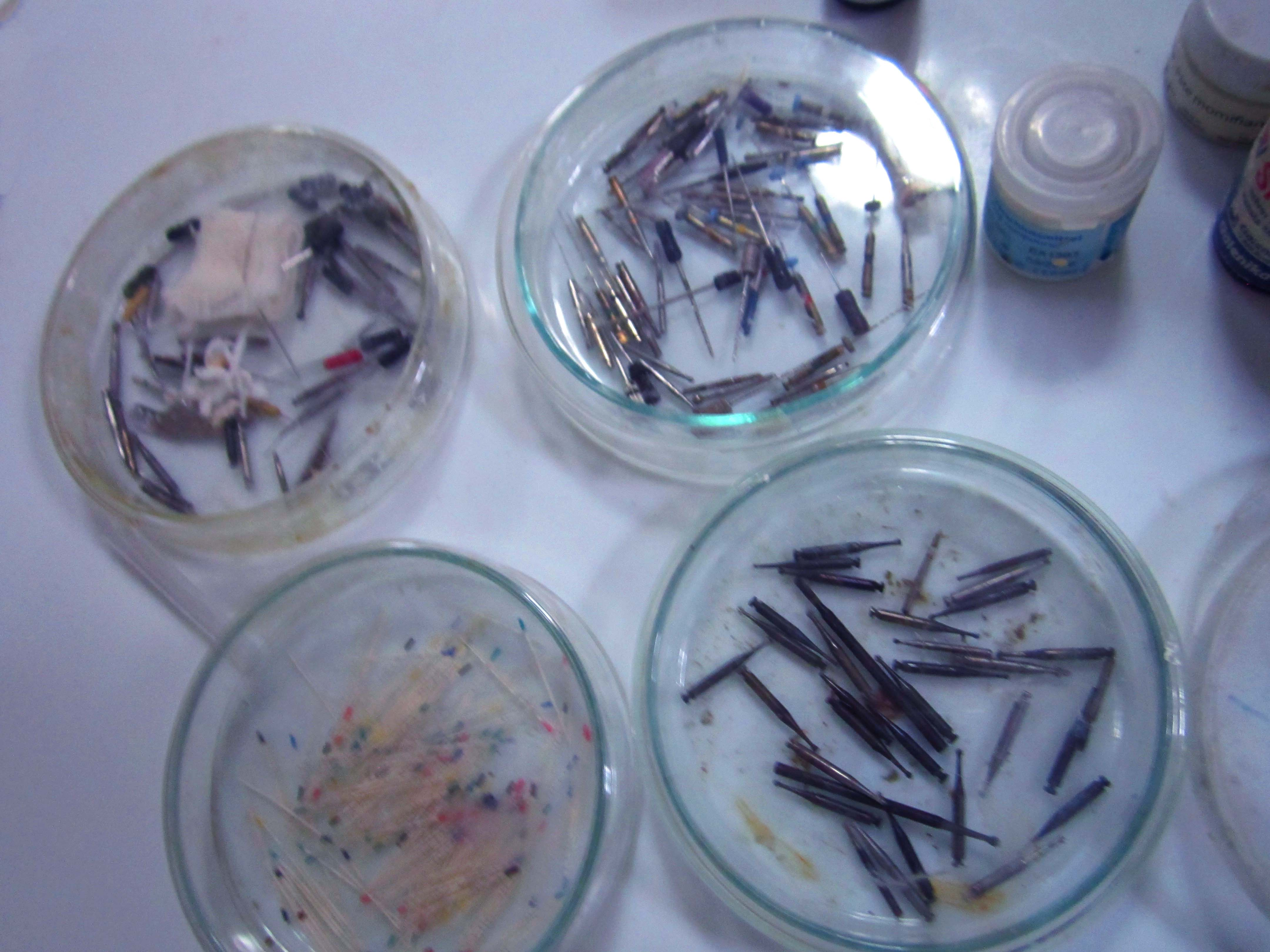
Dental rotary burrs

A dental burr, or bur, is a type of cutter used in a handpiece. The burrs are usually made of tungsten carbide or diamond. The three parts of a burr are the head, the neck, and the shank.

The heads of some burrs (such as tungsten carbide burrs) contain the blades which remove material. These blades may be positioned at different angles in order to change the properties of the burr. More obtuse angles will produce a negative rake angle, which increases the strength and longevity of the burr. More acute angles will produce a positive rake angle, which has a sharper blade but dulls more quickly. The heads of other commonly used burrs are covered in a fine grit that has a similar cutting function to blades (e.g., high-speed diamond burrs). Diamond burrs seem to give better control and tactile feedback than carbide burrs, due to the fact that the diamonds are always in contact with the milled tooth in comparison to the single blades of the carbide burrs.

There are various shapes of burrs that include round, inverted cone, straight fissure, tapered fissure, and pear-shaped burrs. Additional cuts across the blades of burrs were added to increase cutting efficiency, but their benefit has been minimized with the advent of high-speed handpieces. These extra cuts are called crosscuts.

Due to the wide array of different burrs, numbering systems to categorise burrs are used and include a US numbering system and a numbering system used by the International Organization for Standardization (ISO).

Dental burrs typically have shank diameters of either 1.6 mm (1/16 inches) or 2.35 mm (3/32 inches).

== Maintenance ==
The instrument needs to be disinfected or sterilized after every use to prevent infection during subsequent incisions. Due to the mechanical structure of the device, this must not be done with alcoholic disinfectant, as that would destroy the lubricants. Instead, it has to be done in an autoclave after removing the drill, washing the instrument with water, and lubricating it. The United States Food and Drug Administration classes burrs as "single-use devices", although they can be sterilised with proper procedures.

== History ==
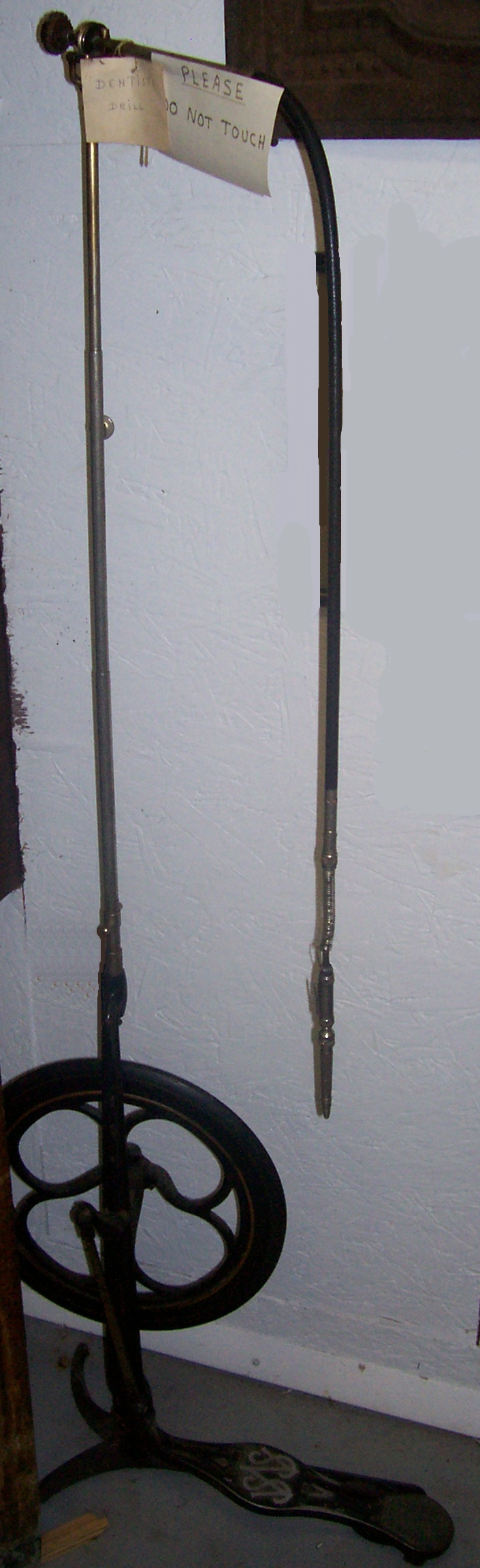
Foot-powered dental drill

The Indus Valley civilization has yielded evidence of dentistry being practiced as far back as 7000 BCE. This earliest form of dentistry involved curing tooth-related disorders with bow drills operated, perhaps, by skilled bead craftsmen. The reconstruction of this ancient form of dentistry showed that the methods used were reliable and effective. Cavities of 3.5 mm depth with concentric grooves indicate the use of a drill tool. The age of the teeth has been estimated at 9,000 years. In later times, mechanical hand drills were used. Like most hand drills, they were quite slow, with speeds of up to 15 rpm. In 1864, British dentist George Fellows Harrington invented a clockwork dental drill named Erado. The device was much faster than earlier drills, but also very noisy. In 1868, American dentist George F. Green came up with a pneumatic dental drill powered by pedal-operated bellows. James B. Morrison devised a pedal-powered burr drill in 1871.

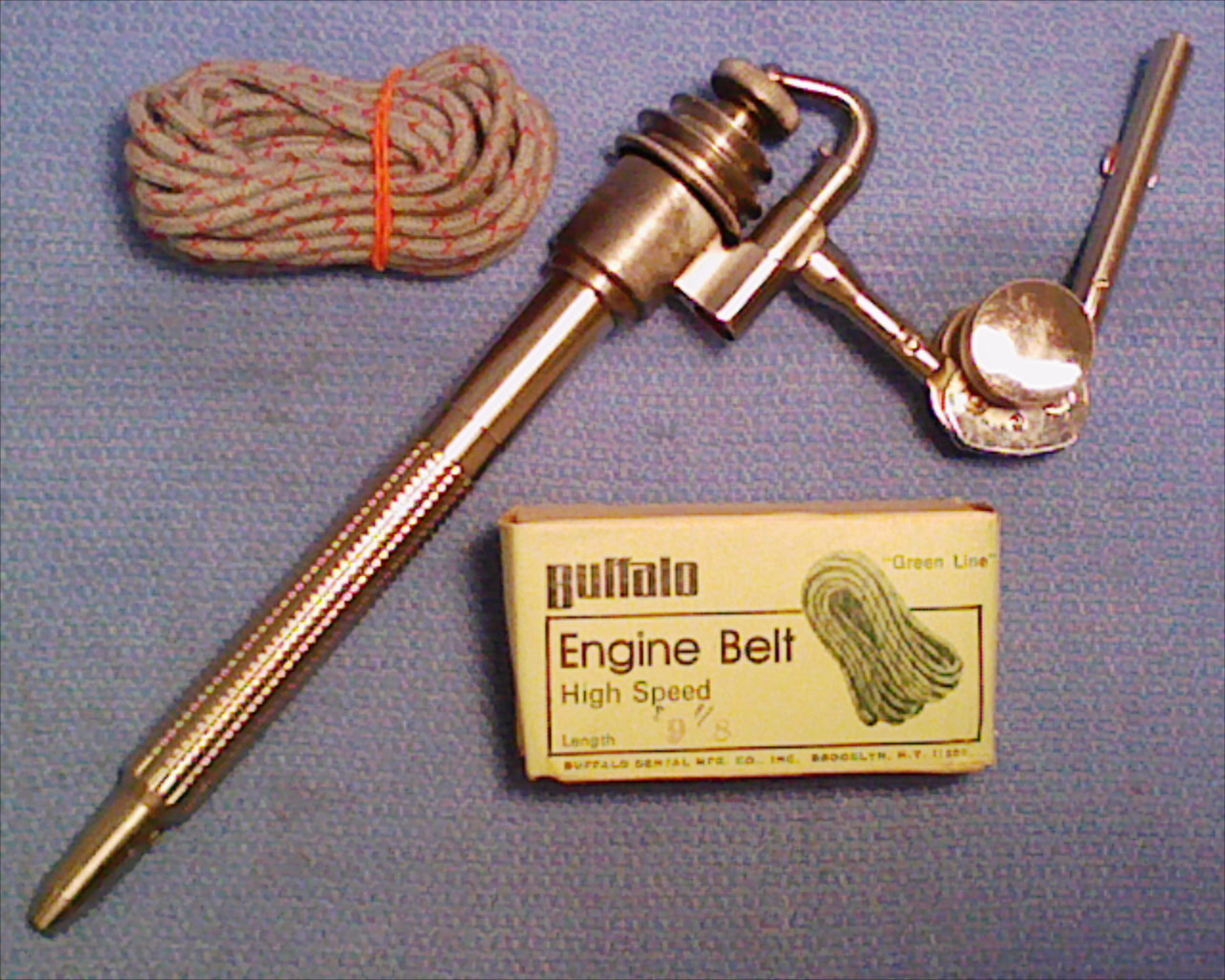
Chayes M33 with Buffalo drive belt

The first electric dental drill was patented in 1875 by Green, a development that revolutionized dentistry. By 1914, electric dental drills could reach speeds of up to 3,000 rpm. A second wave of rapid development occurred in the 1950s and 1960s, including the development of the air turbine drill.

=== Contra-angle ===
The modern incarnation of the dental drill is the air turbine (or air rotor) contra-angle handpiece, where the shaft of the rotary instrument is at an angle, allowing it to reach less accessible areas of the mouth for dental work. The contra-angle was invented by John Patrick Walsh (later knighted) and members of the staff of the Dominion Physical Laboratory (DPL) Wellington, New Zealand. The first official application for a provisional patent for the handpiece was filed in October 1949. This handpiece was driven by compressed air. The patent was granted in November to John Patrick Walsh, who conceived the idea of the contra-angle air-turbine handpiece after he had used a small commercial-type air grinder as a straight handpiece. Dr. John Borden developed it in America and it was first commercially manufactured and distributed by the DENTSPLY Company as the Borden Airotor in 1957. Borden Airotors soon were also manufactured by different other companies like KaVo Dental, which built their first one in 1959.

Current iterations can operate at up to 800,000 rpm; however, the most common is a 400,000 rpm "high speed" handpiece for precision work, complemented by a "low speed" handpiece operating at a speed that is dictated by a micromotor, which creates the momentum (maximum up to 40,000 rpm) for applications requiring higher torque than a high-speed handpiece can deliver.

== Alternatives ==
Starting in the 1990s, a number of alternatives to conventional rotary dental drills have been developed. These include dental laser systems, air abrasion devices (devices that combine small abrasive particles with pressurized air, essentially miniature sand blasters), and dental treatments with ozone or silver diammine fluoride (SDF).
