= Caesium lithium borate =

Names
- IUPAC name caesium oxide—lithium oxide—boron oxide (1/1/6)

Identifiers
CAS Number	161726-68-7
3D model (JSmol)	Interactive image
- InChI: InChI=1S/B6O10.Cs.Li/c7-3-10-1-12-5(14-3)16-6(9)13-2-11-4(8)15-6;;/q-2;2*+1 Key: KPUKOYMQBATNEA-UHFFFAOYSA-N
- SMILES: [Cs+].[Li+].O1B([O-])O[B+]O[B-]1([O-])OB2OB([O-])O[B+]O2

Properties
Chemical formula	CsLiB_{6}O_{10}
Molar mass	364.71 g/mol
Melting point	852 °C (1,566 °F; 1,125 K)

Structure
Crystal structure	tetragonal, point group 4m2
Lattice constant	a = 1049.4 pm, c = 893.9 pm
- Except where otherwise noted, data are given for materials in their standard state (at 25 °C [77 °F], 100 kPa). verify (what is ?) Infobox references

Caesium lithium borate or cesium lithium borate (CsLiB_{6}O_{10}), also known as CLBO, is a non-linear crystal for ultraviolet applications and generates the fourth and fifth harmonics of the Nd:YAG fundamental laser wavelength (1064 nm).

== Nonlinear optical properties of CLBO ==
Harmonics wavelength (nm)	Phase-matching angle (°)	Calculated d_{eff} (pm/V)	Walk-off angle (°)	Angular bandwidth (mrad·cm)	Spectral bandwidth (nm·cm)	Temperature bandwidth (°C·cm)
266	61.6	0.84	1.83	0.49	0.13	8.3
213	67.3	0.87	1.69	0.42	0.16	5.1
