= Laser-assisted new attachment procedure =

Type of periodontal surgery

Laser-assisted new attachment procedure (LANAP) is a surgical therapy for the treatment of periodontitis, intended to work through regeneration rather than resection. This therapy and the laser used to perform it have been in use since 1994. It was developed by Robert H. Gregg II and Delwin McCarthy.

In LANAP surgery, a variable free-running pulsed neodymium:yttrium-aluminum-garnet (Nd:YAG) laser at 1064 nm wavelength is used by a dentist or periodontist to treat the periodontal pocket. The laser is intended to selectively remove diseased or infected pocket epithelium from the underlying connective tissue. The Nd:YAG laser has been shown to reduce levels of microbial pathogens in periodontal pockets and vaporize the pocket-lining epithelium without causing damage to the underlying connective tissue.

== Efficacy ==
The use of lasers in treating periodontal disease has been seen by some dental professionals as controversial. The American Academy of Periodontology stated in 1999 that it was "not aware of any randomized blinded controlled longitudinal clinical trials, cohort or longitudinal studies, or case-controlled studies indicating that 'laser excisional new attachment procedure (or Laser ENAP)' or 'laser curettage' offers any advantageous clinical result not achieved by traditional periodontal therapy. Moreover, published studies suggest that use of lasers for ENAP procedures and/or gingival curettage could render root surfaces and adjacent alveolar bone incompatible with normal cell attachment and healing."

A 2015 systematic review from the AAP regeneration workshop acknowledged peer-reviewed studies reporting periodontal regeneration, and further suggested that the LANAP protocol's minimally invasive nature may offer advantages in the regeneration of defects where minimal soft tissue change is required. The AAP consumer information page on laser therapy for gum disease notes that lasers can be used to treat periodontal disease and that controlled studies have reported similar results to some other treatment options (including scaling and root planing alone), and also states that different laser wavelengths have different applications in periodontal treatment.

A 2018 American Academy of Periodontology best-evidence consensus statement concluded that, as an adjunct to conventional periodontal therapy, appropriately applied laser therapy may provide a modest additional benefit (<1 mm) in probing depth reduction and clinical attachment level compared with conventional therapy, but that evidence is inadequate to conclude that laser therapy alone is superior or comparable to conventional periodontal therapy. The same statement found evidence inadequate to conclude an additional benefit for residual pockets after conventional therapy and at least one year of periodontal maintenance care.

European Federation of Periodontology guidance for treatment of stage I–III periodontitis states that lasers as an adjunct to subgingival instrumentation are not suggested.

=== Scope and related laser-based procedures ===
LANAP is commonly described as a wavelength-dependent, flapless periodontal pocket treatment protocol performed with an Nd:YAG laser (1064 nm).

Other minimally invasive or adjunctive laser approaches to periodontal and peri-implant pocket therapy using different wavelengths have been described and are distinct from LANAP. A review reports that CO_{2} laser systems share soft-tissue applications with diode and Nd:YAG lasers (bacterial reduction, debridement in pockets and around implants, and coagulation), but that clinical studies and meta-analyses have not consistently shown statistically significant improvements versus mechanical debridement alone.

For peri-implant diseases, an AAP best-evidence review and meta-analysis reported that laser therapy in combination with surgical or non-surgical therapy provided minimal benefit for several clinical outcomes, and noted that the controlled evidence included in the analyses was limited to Er:YAG, CO_{2} laser, and diode lasers.

In 2016, the FDA cleared labeling for an Nd:YAG system that included an indication describing “promotion of true regeneration” (new cementum, periodontal ligament, and alveolar bone) when used specifically in the LANAP protocol.

A 2017 review concluded that studies of lasers in the treatment of periodontitis had not provided sufficient evidence that laser use provides benefit over traditional therapy. One clinical study reported reductions in selected periodontal pathogens following the LANAP protocol compared with scaling and root planing; the clinical significance of microbiologic changes relative to long-term clinical outcomes remains a subject of ongoing study and debate in the literature.

== Benefits of laser gum disease surgery ==
According to the Academy of General Dentistry (AGD), there are benefits to dental lasers including: reduce symptoms and healing times associated with traditional therapies; reduce the amount of bacteria in both diseased gum tissue and in tooth cavities; and control bleeding during surgery.

The 1064 Nd:YAG laser kills at least three different periodontal pathogens without harming normal tissues: (Porphyromonas gingivalis (Pg) and Prevotella intermedia (Pi), and Candida albicans (Ca); a pathogenic fungus. This unique aspect of laser irradiation to affect some tissue and not others is termed Selective Photoantisepsis, and is due to differential absorption between host tissue and pathogens.

Nd:YAG laser light treatment has shown a long-lasting effect on the shift of bacterial subgingival flora, decreasing pathogenic bacteria and creating an environment where normal flora survives.

== See also ==
- List of laser articles
- Dental laser
- Periodontal disease
