= Air abrasion =

Air abrasion is a dental technique that uses compressed air to propel a thin stream of abrasive particles—often aluminum oxide or silica—through a specialized hand-piece to remove tooth tissue and decay before being suctioned away, similar to sand blasting. It can be used in a variety of dental procedures, including removing tooth decay, stains, and old restorations, as well as to prepare teeth for new restorations, sealants, and bonding.

== Advantages and disadvantages ==
Advantages of air abrasion include that it preserves more healthy tooth tissue (which can increase the strength and longevity of restorations), and has less risk of fracturing or chipping a tooth when compared to a traditional pneumatic dental drill. Air abrasion generates minimal noise, vibration, pressure, and heat, all of which can increase patient comfort and reduce or eliminate the need for local anesthesia.

Disadvantages of air abrasion include not being appropriate for removing decay in all situations (such as deep decay or decay between teeth) and the initial investment costs of an air abrasion system. Additionally, there are some concerns related to the possible health effects of inhaling abrasive particles (including possible aggravation of certain medical conditions such as asthma and chronic obstructive pulmonary disease) and clean-up concerns. Risks related to inhaling abrasive particles can be minimized by using a dental dam, appropriate suction, and combining water into the air abrasive steam.

== History ==
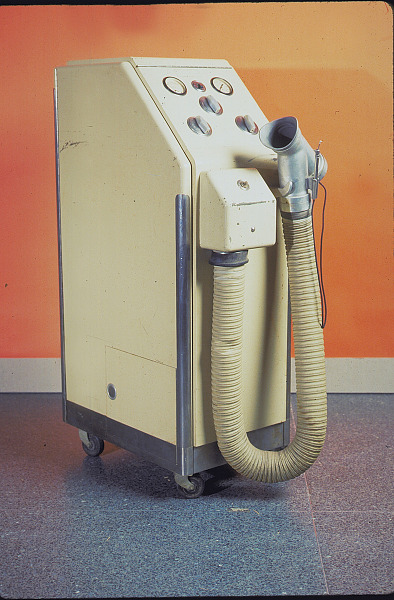
Airdent

In the 1940s, dentist Robert Black began researching air abrasion technology and its use in dentistry. In 1951, Black and the S.S. White Dental Manufacturing Co. released the first commercial dental air abrasion system, the Airdent air abrasion unit. The unit failed to gain wide popularity due to several factors, including the inability of air abrasion to prepare the well-defined margins and walls needed for the amalgam restorations used at the time, the lack of high-velocity suction available for powder control, and the introduction of the time-saving air turbine drill. Air abrasion began to resurface in the 1990s with the rise of adhesive dentistry.

== See also ==
- Abrasion (dental)
- Dental laser
- Minimal intervention dentistry
- Air-powder polishing
