= Chrysoberyl =

Mineral or gemstone of beryllium aluminate

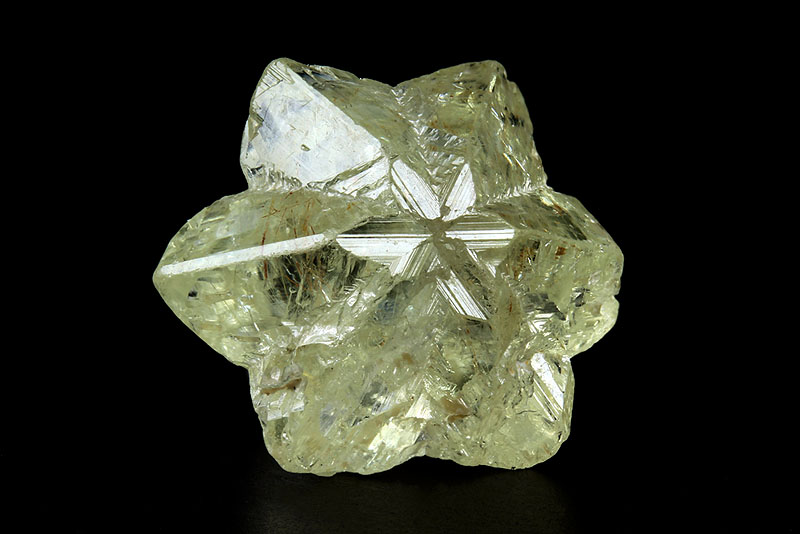
- Cyclic trilling of chrysoberyl

General
- Category: Oxide minerals
- Formula: BeAl_{2}O_{4}
- IMA symbol: Cbrl
- Strunz classification: 4.BA.05
- Crystal system: Orthorhombic
- Crystal class: Dipyramidal (mmm); H-M symbol: (2/m 2/m 2/m)
- Space group: Pbnm
- Unit cell: a = 5.481 Å, b = 9.415 Å, c = 4.428 Å; Z = 4

Identification
- Color: Various shades of green, emerald-green yellow, blue, brownish to greenish black, may be raspberry-red under incandescent light when chromian; colorless, pale shades of yellow, green, or red in transmitted light
- Crystal habit: Crystals tabular or short prismatic, prominently striated
- Twinning: Contact and penetration twins common, often repeated forming rosette structures
- Cleavage: Distinct on {110}, imperfect on {010}, poor on {001}
- Fracture: Conchoidal to uneven
- Tenacity: Brittle
- Mohs scale hardness: 8.5
- Luster: Vitreous
- Streak: White
- Specific gravity: 3.5–3.84
- Optical properties: Biaxial (+)
- Refractive index: n_{α}=1.745 n_{β}=1.748 n_{γ}=1.754
- Pleochroism: X = red; Y = yellow-orange; Z = emerald-green
- 2V angle: Measured: 70°

Major varieties
- Alexandrite: Color change; green to red
- Cymophane: Chatoyant

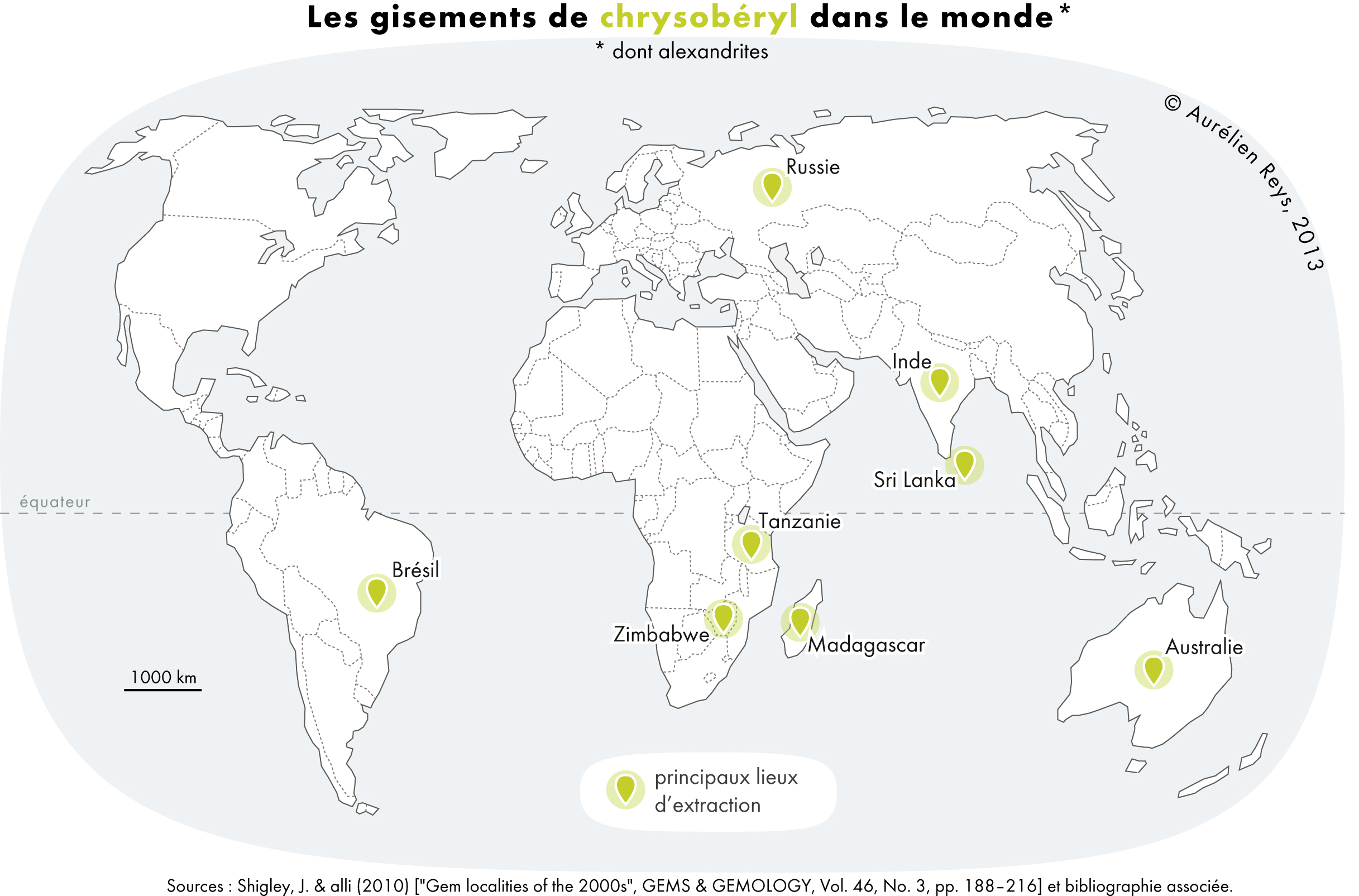
Main chrysoberyl producing countries

The mineral or gemstone chrysoberyl is an aluminate of beryllium with the formula Be Al_{2}O_{4}. The name chrysoberyl is derived from the Greek words χρυσός chrysos and βήρυλλος beryllos, meaning "a gold-white spar". Despite the similarity of their names, chrysoberyl and beryl are two completely different gemstones, although they both contain beryllium, aluminium and oxygen. Chrysoberyl is the third-hardest frequently encountered natural gemstone and lies at 8.5 on the Mohs scale of mineral hardness, between corundum (9) and topaz (8).

An interesting feature of its crystals are the cyclic twins called trillings. These twinned crystals have a hexagonal appearance, but are the result of a triplet of twins with each "twin" oriented at 120° to its neighbors and taking up 120° of the cyclic trilling. If only two of the three possible twin orientations are present, a V-shaped twin results.

Ordinary chrysoberyl is yellowish-green and transparent to translucent. When the mineral exhibits good pale green to yellow color and is transparent, then it is used as a gemstone. The three main varieties of chrysoberyl are: ordinary yellow-to-green chrysoberyl, cat's eye or cymophane, and alexandrite. Yellow-green chrysoberyl was referred to as "chrysolite" during the Victorian and Edwardian eras, which caused confusion since that name has also been used for the mineral olivine ("peridot" as a gemstone); that name is no longer used in the gemological nomenclature.

Alexandrite, a strongly pleochroic (trichroic) gem, will exhibit emerald green, red and orange-yellow colors depending on viewing direction in partially polarised light. However, its most distinctive property is that it also changes color in artificial (tungsten/halogen) light compared to daylight. The color change from red to green is due to strong absorption of light in a narrow yellow portion of the spectrum, while allowing large bands of more blue-green and red wavelengths to be transmitted. Which of these prevails to give the perceived hue depends on the spectral balance of the illumination. Fine-quality alexandrite has a green to bluish-green color in daylight (relatively blue illumination of high color temperature), changing to a red to purplish-red color in incandescent light (relatively yellow illumination). However, fine-color material is extremely rare. Less-desirable stones may have daylight colors of yellowish-green and incandescent colors of brownish red.

Cymophane is popularly known as "cat's eye". This variety exhibits pleasing chatoyancy or opalescence that reminds one of the eye of a cat. When cut to produce a cabochon, the mineral forms a light-green specimen with a silky band of light extending across the surface of the stone.

== Occurrence ==
Chrysoberyl forms as a result of pegmatitic processes. Melting in the Earth's crust produces relatively low-density molten magma which can rise upwards towards the surface. As the main magma body cools, water originally present in low concentrations became more concentrated in the molten rock because it could not be incorporated into the crystallization of solid minerals. The remnant magma thus becomes richer in water, and also in rare elements that similarly do not fit in the crystal structures of major rock-forming minerals. The water extends the temperature range downwards before the magma becomes completely solid, allowing concentration of rare elements to proceed so far that they produce their own distinctive minerals. The resulting rock is igneous in appearance but formed at a low temperature from a water-rich melt, with large crystals of the common minerals such as quartz and feldspar, but also with elevated concentrations of rare elements such as beryllium, lithium, or niobium, often forming their own minerals; this is called a pegmatite. The high water content of the magma made it possible for the crystals to grow quickly, so pegmatite crystals are often quite large, which increases the likelihood of gem specimens forming.

Chrysoberyl can also grow in the country rocks near to pegmatites, when Be- and Al-rich fluids from the pegmatite react with surrounding minerals. Hence, it can be found in mica schists and in contact with metamorphic deposits of dolomitic marble. Because it is a hard, dense mineral that is resistant to chemical alteration, it can be weathered out of rocks and deposited in river sands and gravels in alluvial deposits with other gem minerals such as diamond, corundum, topaz, spinel, garnet, and tourmaline. When found in such placers, it will have rounded edges instead of sharp, wedge-shape forms. Much of the chrysoberyl mined in Brazil and Sri Lanka is recovered from placers, as the host rocks have been intensely weathered and eroded.

If the pegmatite fluid is rich in beryllium, crystals of beryl or chrysoberyl could form. Beryl has a high ratio of beryllium to aluminium, while the opposite is true for chrysoberyl. Both are stable with the common mineral quartz. For alexandrite to form, some chromium would also have had to be present. However, beryllium and chromium do not tend to occur in the same types of rock. Chromium is most common in mafic and ultramafic rocks in which beryllium is extremely rare. Beryllium becomes concentrated in felsic pegmatites in which chromium is almost absent. Therefore, the only situation where an alexandrite can grow is when Be-rich pegmatitic fluids react with Cr-rich country rock. This unusual requirement explains the rarity of this chrysoberyl variety.

== Alexandrite ==
The alexandrite variety displays a color change dependent upon the nature of ambient lighting. Alexandrite results from small scale replacement of aluminum by chromium ions in the crystal structure, which causes intense absorption of light over a narrow range of wavelengths in the yellow region (520–620 nm) of the visible light spectrum. Because human vision is most sensitive to green light and least sensitive to red light, alexandrite appears greenish in daylight where the full spectrum of visible light is present, and reddish in incandescent light which emits less green and blue light. This color change is independent of any change of hue with viewing direction through the crystal that would arise from pleochroism.

Alexandrite from the Ural Mountains in Russia can be green by daylight and red by incandescent light. Other varieties of alexandrite may be yellowish or pink in daylight and a columbine or raspberry red by incandescent light.

Stones that show a dramatic color change and strong colors (e.g., red-to-green) are rare and sought-after, but stones that show less distinct colors (e.g. yellowish green changing to brownish yellow) may also be considered "alexandrite" by gem labs such as the Gemological Institute of America.

Alexandrite was discovered by the Finnish mineralogist Nils Gustaf Nordenskiöld (1792–1866), and named alexandrite in honor of the future Emperor of All Russia Alexander II Romanov. Nordenskiöld's initial discovery occurred as a result of an examination of a newly found mineral sample he had received from Perovskii, which he identified as emerald at first. The first emerald mine had been opened in 1831. However, recent research suggests that the stone was discovered by Yakov Kokovin.

Alexandrite 5 carats (1,000 mg) and larger were traditionally thought to be found only in the Ural Mountains, but have since been found in larger sizes in Brazil. Other deposits are located in India (Andhra Pradesh), Madagascar, Tanzania and Sri Lanka. Alexandrite in sizes over three carats are very rare. Today, several labs can produce synthetic lab-grown stones with the same chemical and physical properties as natural alexandrite. Several methods can produce flux-grown alexandrite, Czochralski (or pulled) alexandrite, and hydrothermally-produced alexandrite. Flux-grown gems are fairly difficult to distinguish from natural alexandrite as they contain inclusions that seem natural. Czochralski or pulled alexandrite is easier to identify because it is very clean and contains curved striations visible under magnification. Although the color change in pulled stones can be from blue to red, the color change does not truly resemble that of natural alexandrite from any deposit. Hydrothermal lab-grown alexandrite has identical physical and chemical properties to real alexandrite.

Some gemstones falsely described as lab-grown synthetic alexandrite are actually corundum laced with trace elements (e.g., vanadium) or color-change spinel and are not actually chrysoberyl. As a result, they would be more accurately described as simulated alexandrite rather than "synthetic". This alexandrite-like sapphire material has been around for almost 100 years and shows a characteristic purple-mauve colour change, which does not really look like alexandrite because there is never any green.

Alexandrite is also known as one of three official birthstones for the month of June.

Alexandrite

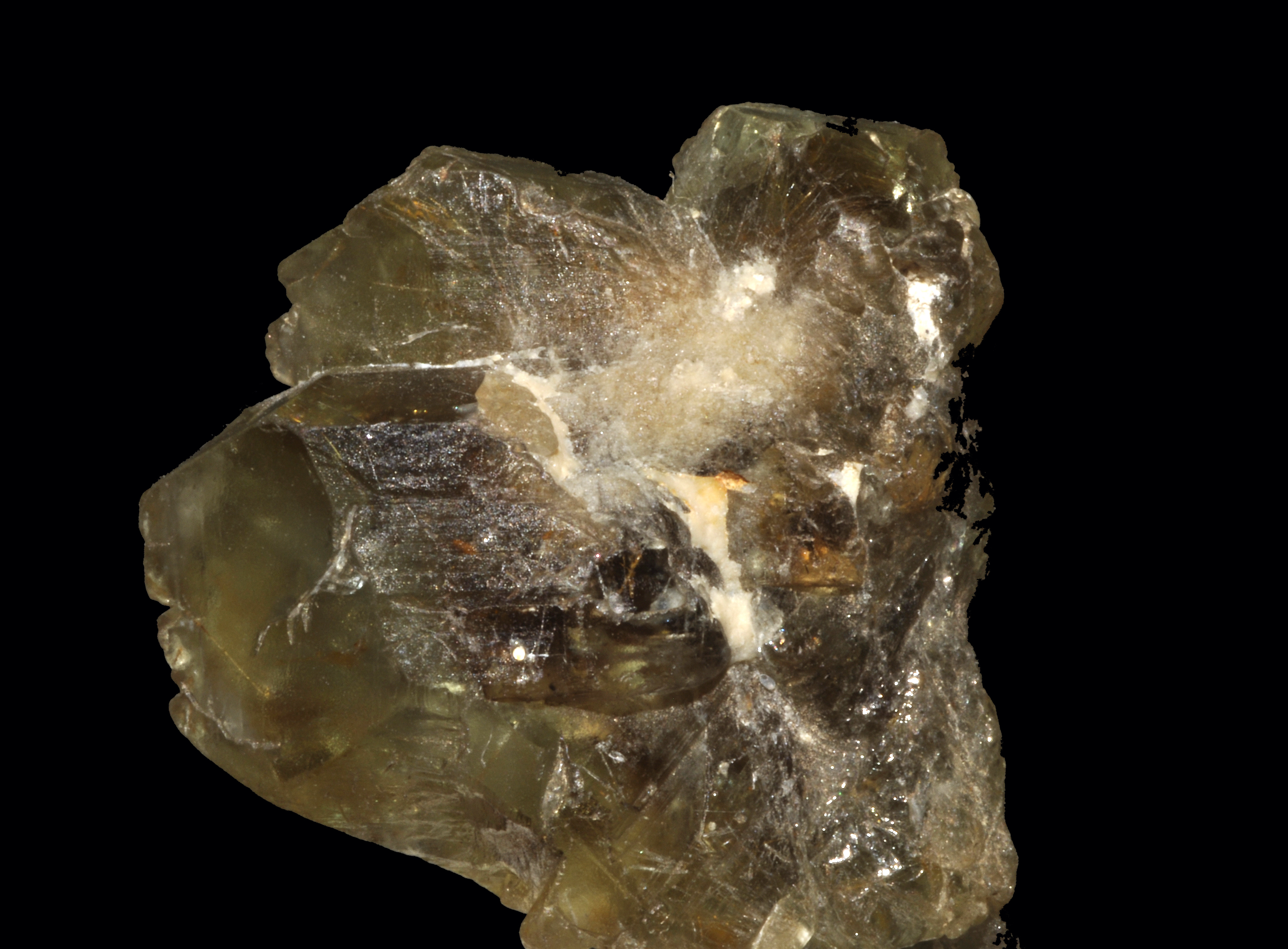
Rough alexandrite from Brazil

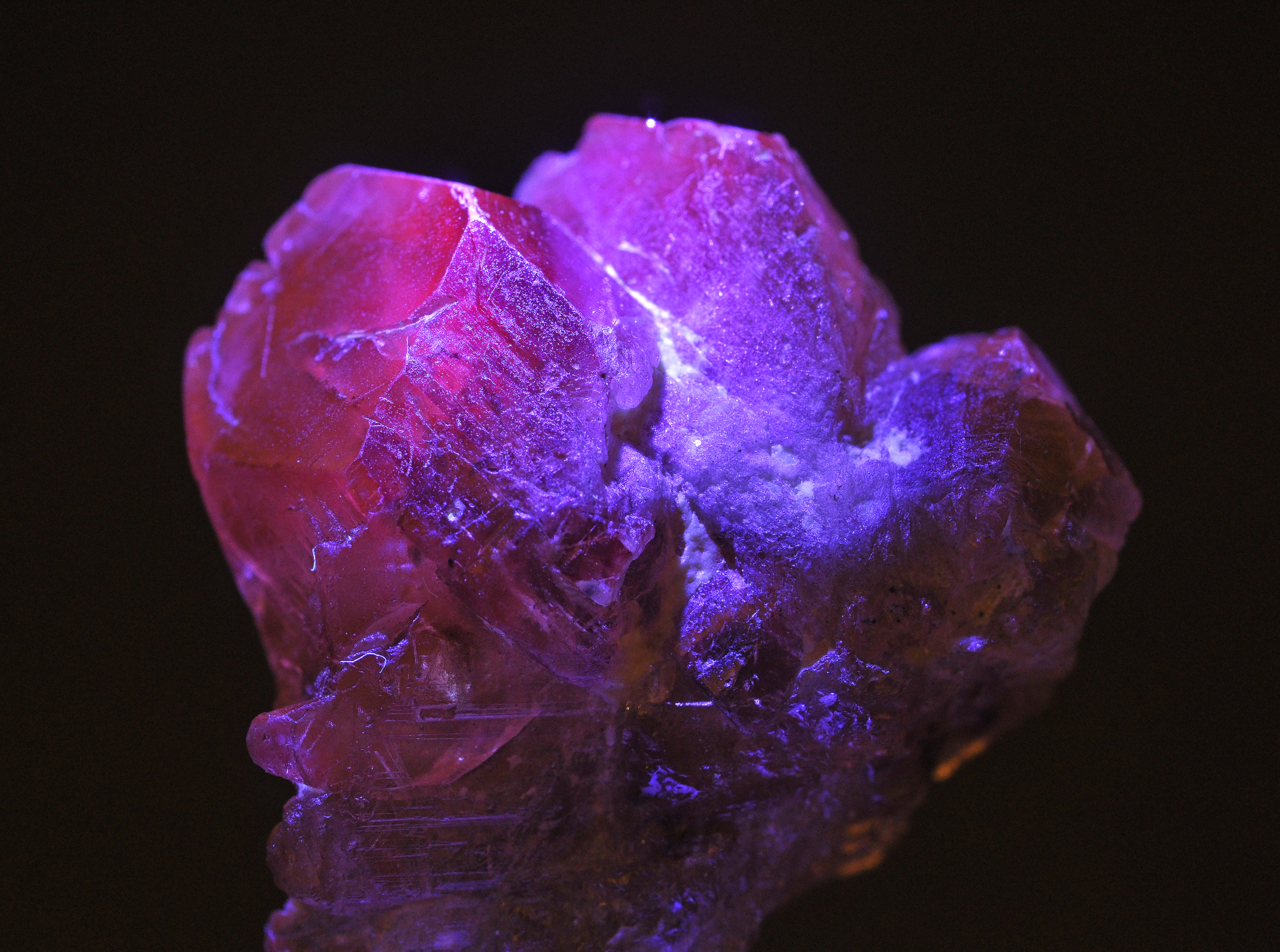
Rough alexandrite under UV light

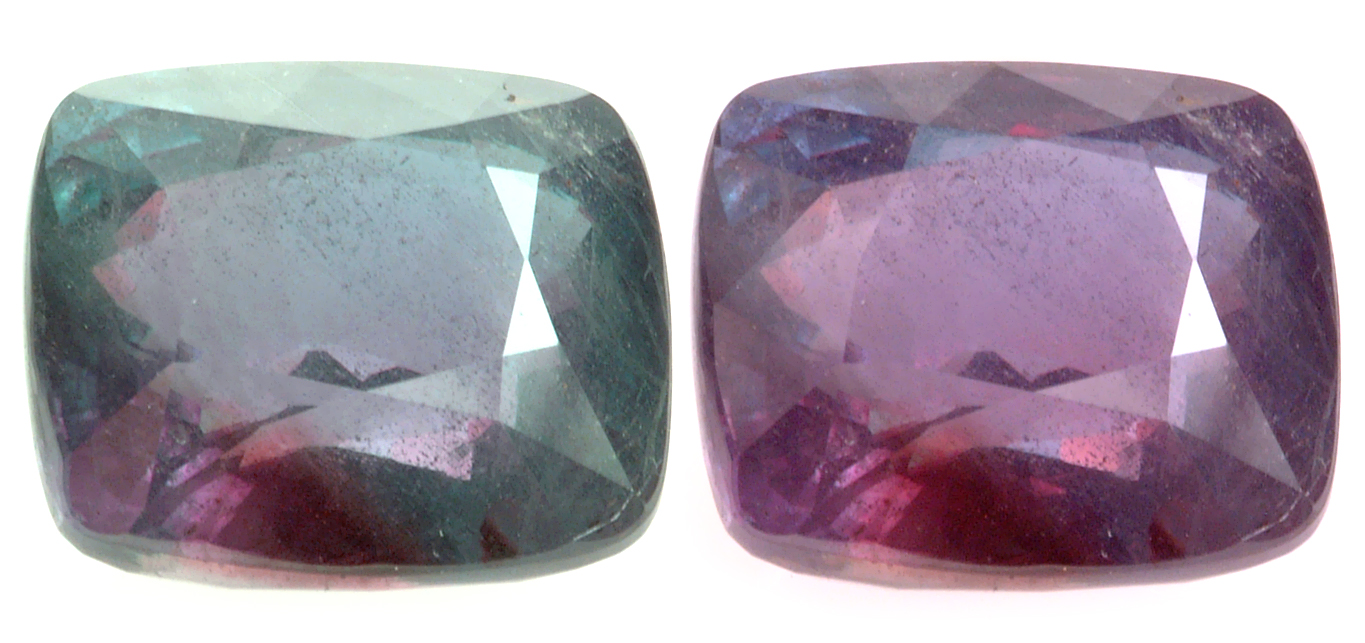
Alexandrite step cut cushion, 26.75 cts. This stone is bluish green in daylight and purple red under incandescent light

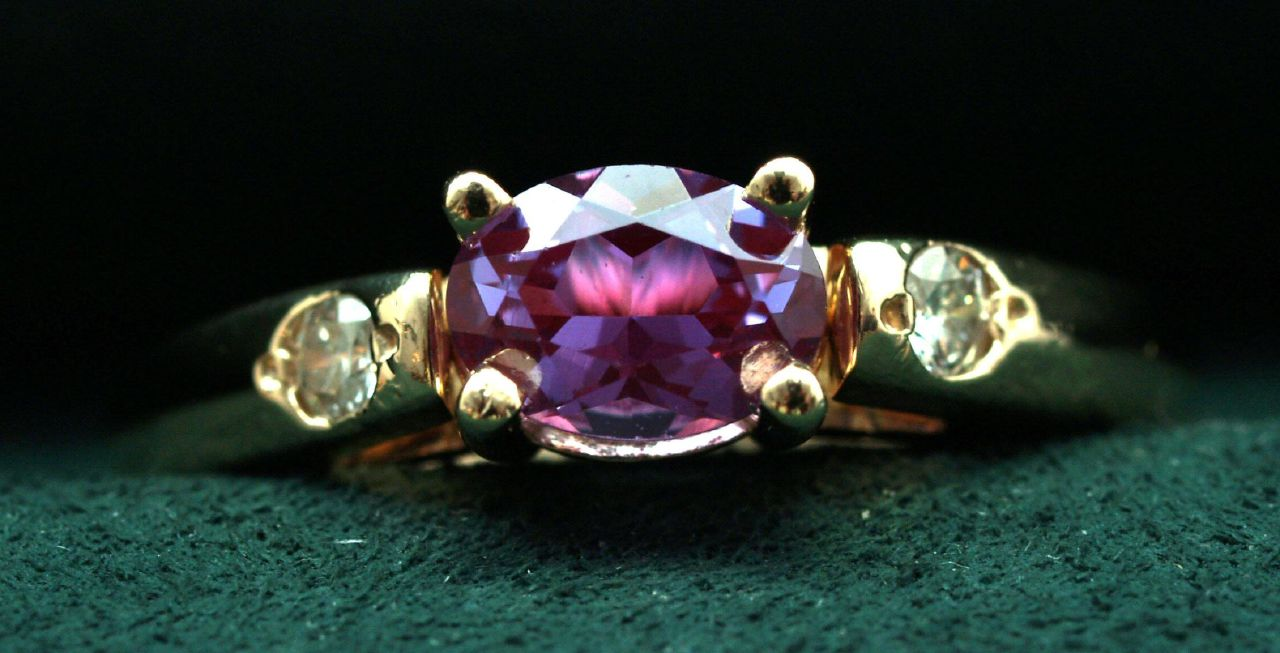
An alexandrite ring with diamonds

== Cymophane ==
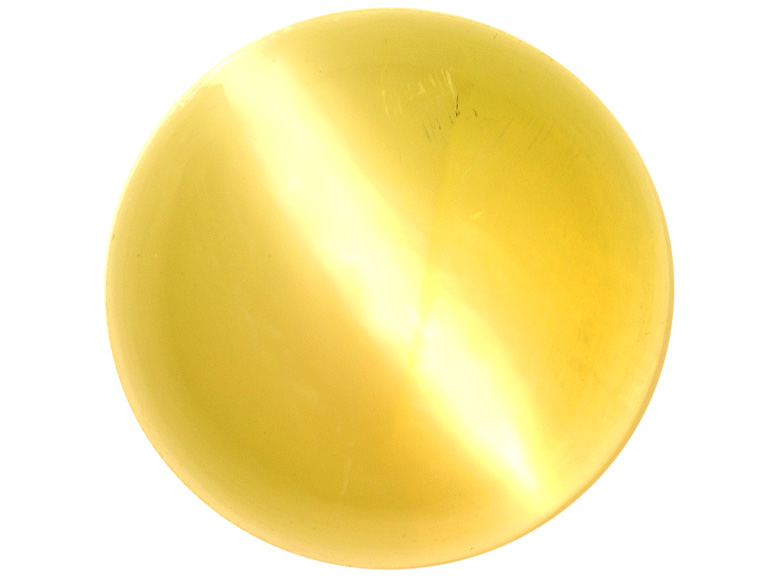
Fine-color cymophane with a sharp and centered eye

Translucent yellowish chatoyant chrysoberyl is called cymophane or cat's eye. Cymophane has its derivation also from the Greek words meaning 'wave' and 'appearance', in reference to the haziness that visually distorts what would normally be viewed as a well defined surface of a cabochon. This effect may be combined with a cat eye effect. In this variety, microscopic tubelike cavities or needle-like inclusions of rutile occur in an orientation parallel to the c-axis, producing a chatoyant effect visible as a single ray of light passing across the crystal. This effect is best seen in gemstones cut in cabochon forms perpendicular to the c-axis. The color in yellow chrysoberyl is due to Fe^{3+} impurities.

Although other minerals such as tourmaline, scapolite, corundum, spinel and quartz can form "cat's eye" stones similar in appearance to cymophane, the jewelry industry designates these stones as "quartz cat's eyes", or "ruby cat's eyes" and only chrysoberyl can be referred to as "cat's eye" with no other designation.

Gems lacking the silky inclusions required to produce the cat's eye effect are usually faceted. An alexandrite cat's eye is a chrysoberyl cat's eye that changes color. "Milk and honey" is a term commonly used to describe the color of the best cat's eyes. The effect refers to the sharp milky ray of white light normally crossing the cabochon as a center line along its length and overlying the honey-colored background. The honey color is considered to be top-grade by many gemologists but the lemon yellow colors are also popular and attractive. Cat's eye material is found as a small percentage of the overall chrysoberyl production wherever chrysoberyl is found.

Cat's eye became significantly more popular by the end of the 19th century when the Duke of Connaught gave a ring with a cat's eye as an engagement token; this was sufficient to make the stone more popular and increase its value greatly. Until that time, cat's eye had predominantly been present in gem and mineral collections. The increased demand in turn created an intensified search for it in Sri Lanka.

== In popular culture ==
Girl group Katseye derived their name from the cymophane variety of chrysoberyl gem stones.

Anthropomorphic characters of some forms of chrysoberyl (namely alexandrite) appear in the manga and anime series Land of the Lustrous.

In the animated series Steven Universe, Alexandrite, a form of chrysoberyl is the fusion between the main characters Garnet, Amethyst and Pearl.

== See also ==
- List of minerals
