= Synthetic alexandrite =

Artificially-grown variety of gemstone chrysoberyl

Synthetic alexandrite is an artificially grown crystalline variety of chrysoberyl, composed of beryllium aluminum oxide (BeAl_{2}O_{4}).

The name is also often used erroneously to describe synthetically-grown corundum that simulates the appearance of alexandrite, but with a different mineral composition.

== Manufacture ==
Most true synthetic alexandrite is grown by the Czochralski method, known as “pulling”. Another method is a “floating zone”, developed in 1964 by an Armenian scientist Khachatur Saakovich Bagdasarov, of the Russian (former Soviet) Institute of Crystallography, Moscow. Bagdasarov’s floating zone method was widely used to manufacture white YAG for spacecraft and submarine lighting, before the process found its way into jewelry production. Alexandrite crystals grown by floating zone method tend to have less intensity in color than crystals grown by the pulled method.

Flux-grown alexandrite stones are expensive to make and are grown in platinum crucibles. Crystals of platinum may still be evident in the cut stones. Alexandrite grown by the flux-melt process will contain particles of flux, resembling liquid “feathers” with a refractive index and specific gravity that echo that of natural alexandrite. Some stones contain parallel groups of negative crystals. Due to the high cost of this process, it is no longer used commercially.

The largest producer of jewelry quality laboratory-grown alexandrite to this day is Tairus. Production capacity is in the range of 100 kg/year.

== Chrysoberyl-based synthetics ==
Czochralski or “pulled” alexandrite is easier to identify because it is very “clean”. Curved striations visible with magnification are a give-away. Some pulled stones have been seen to change color from blue to red – similar to natural alexandrite from Brazil, Madagascar, and India. Seiko synthetic alexandrites show a swirled internal structure characteristic of the floating zone method of synthesis. They have “tadpole” inclusions (with long tails) and spherical bubbles.

Flux-grown alexandrites are more difficult to spot because of their convincing colors, and because they are not “clean”. Their inclusions of undissolved flux can look like inclusions in natural chrysoberyl. However, layers of dust-like particles parallel to the seed plate, and strong banding or growth lines may also be apparent. (Note: The crystals on the seed plane(s) of flux-grown alexandrites are not platinum, but rather silicon carbide from the furnace heating elements during crucible and nutrient changes.)

The Inamori synthetic alexandrite had a cat's eye variety, which showed a distinct color change. The eye was broad and of moderate intensity. Specimens were a dark greyish-green with slightly purple overtones under fluorescent lighting. The eye was slightly greenish-bluish-white and the stones were dull and oily. They appeared to be inclusion-free and under a strong incandescent light in the long direction, asterism could be seen with two rays weaker than the eye. This has not been reported in natural alexandrite. Under magnification, parallel striations could be seen along the length of the cabochon and the striations were undulating rather than straight, again not a feature of natural alexandrite.

The name allexite has been used for synthetic alexandrite manufactured by the Diamonair Corporation who maintains that its product is Czochralski-grown.

== Corundum-based simulated alexandrite ==
Most gemstones described as synthetic alexandrite are actually simulated alexandrite: Synthetic corundum laced with vanadium to produce the color change. This alexandrite-like sapphire material has been known for almost 100 years.

The material shows a characteristic purple-mauve color change which, although attractive, differs from alexandrite because there is never any green. The stones will be very clean and may be available in large sizes. Gemological testing will reveal a refractive index of 1.759–1.778 (corundum) instead of 1.741–1.760 (chrysoberyl). Under magnification, gas bubbles and curved stria may be evident. When examined with a spectroscope a strong vanadium absorption line at 475 nm will be apparent.
