= Dental laser =

Laser used in dentistry

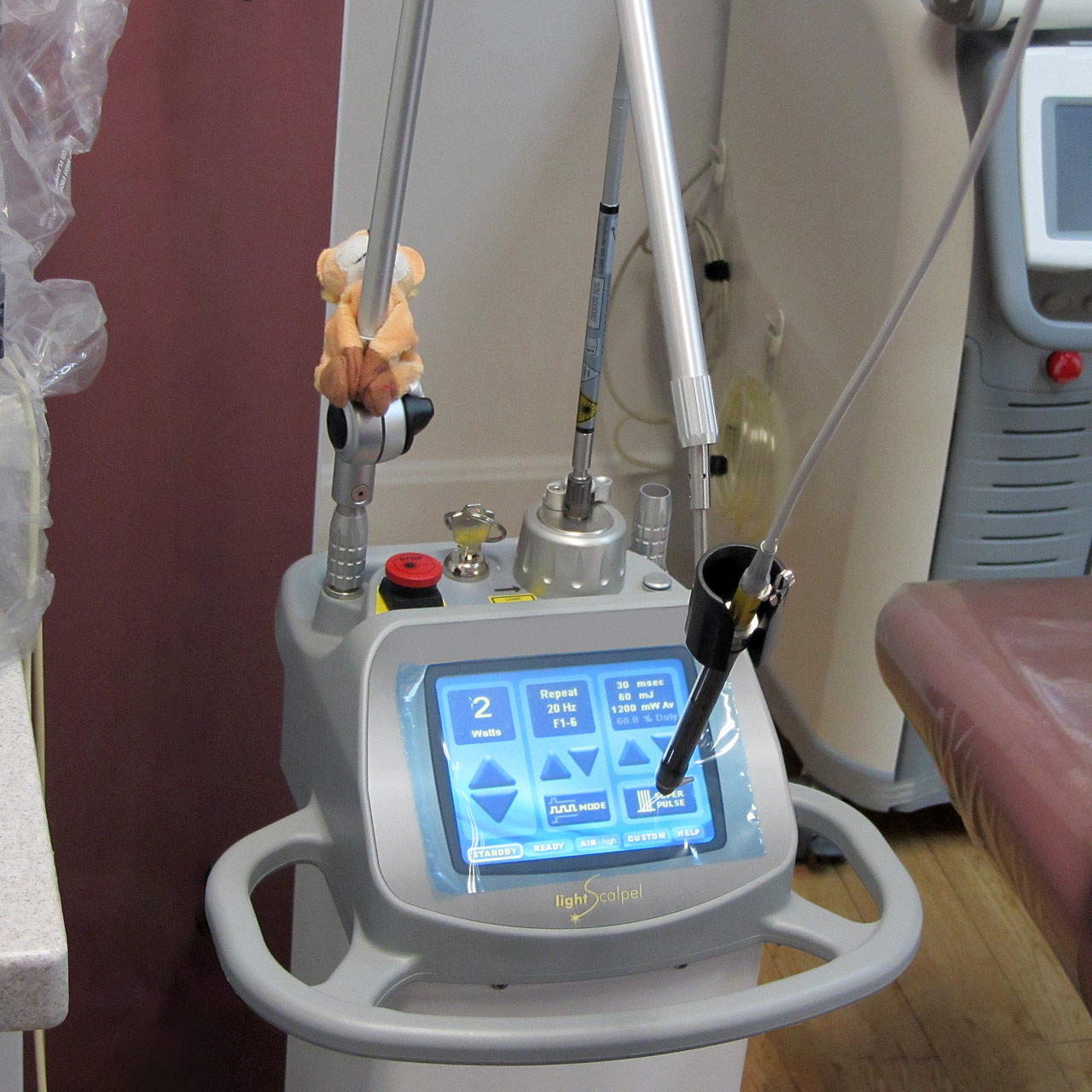
A LightScalpel CO_{2} laser system used in dental soft tissue procedures.

A dental laser is a type of laser designed specifically for use in oral surgery or dentistry.

In the United States, the use of lasers on the gums was first approved by the Food and Drug Administration in the early 1990s, and use on hard tissue like teeth or the bone of the mandible gained approval in 1996. Several variants of dental lasers are in use with different wavelengths and these mean they are better suited for different applications.

== Soft tissue lasers ==
- Diode lasers
- Carbon dioxide lasers
- Nd:YAG laser

Diode lasers wavelengths in the 810–1,100 nm range are poorly absorbed by the soft tissues such as the gingivae, and cannot be used for soft tissue cutting or ablation. Instead, the distal end of diode's glass fiber is charred (by burned ink or by burned corkwood, etc.) and the char is heated by the 810-1,100 nm laser beam, which in turn heats up the glass fiber's tip. The soft tissue is cut, on contact, by the hot charred glass tip and not by the laser beam itself. This is used for variety of oral surgery procedures such as gingivectomy, frenectomy, treatment of pericoronitis, and exposure of superficially impacted teeth. This method was primarily used by the Michigan school of dentistry .

Similarly Nd:YAG lasers are used for soft tissue surgeries in the oral cavity, such as gingivectomy, periodontal sulcular debridement, LANAP, frenectomy, biopsy, and coagulation of graft donor sites. The Nd:YAG laser wavelength are partially absorbed by pigment in the tissue such as hemoglobin and melanin. These lasers are often used for debridement and disinfection of periodontal pockets. Their coagulative ability to form fibrin allows them to seal treated pockets.

The CO_{2} laser remains the best surgical laser for the soft tissue where both cutting and hemostasis is achieved photo-thermally (radiantly).

== Soft and hard tissue lasers ==
- Er:YAG laser
- Carbon dioxide laser
- Er,Cr:YSGG laser

Erbium lasers are both hard and soft tissue capable. They can be used for a host of dental procedures, and allow for more procedures to be done without local anaesthesia. Erbium lasers can be used for hard tissue procedures like bone cutting and create minimal thermal and mechanical trauma to adjacent tissues. These hard tissue procedures show an excellent healing response. Soft tissue applications with erbium lasers feature less hemostasis and coagulation abilities relative to the CO_{2} lasers. Er,Cr:YSGG laser was found to be effective in gum de-pigmentation. The new CO_{2} laser operating at 9,300 nm features strong absorption in both soft and hard tissue and is the newest alternative to erbium lasers. The 9,300 nm laser ablates hard tissue in excess of 5,000 °C, which often results in extremely bright thermal radiation.

== Dental caries removal ==
In September 2016, the Cochrane collaboration published a systematic review of the current evidence comparing the use of lasers for caries removal, in both deciduous and adult teeth, with the standard dental drill. The authors reviewed nine trials published between 1998 and 2014, with 662 participants in total. These included three different types of laser: Er:YAG; Er,Cr:YSGG; and Nd:YAG. Overall, the quality of the evidence available was found to be low, and the authors were unable to recommend one method of caries removal over the other. There was no evidence of a difference between the marginal integrity or durability of the restorations placed. However, there was some evidence that the laser produced less pain and required less anesthesia than the drill. The authors concluded that more research is required.

== Cost of lasers ==
Use of the dental laser remains limited, with cost and effectiveness being the primary barriers. The cost of a dental laser ranges from $4,000 to $130,000, where a pneumatic dental drill costs about $1500. Hard tissue lasers are incapable of performing some routine operations in the treatment of cavities.

== Benefits of lasers ==
Dental lasers are not without their benefits, though, as the use of a laser can decrease morbidity after surgery, and reduces the need for anesthetics. Because of the cauterisation of tissue there will be little bleeding following soft tissue procedures, and some of the risks of alternative electrosurgery procedures are avoided. Additionally, the use of dental lasers is associated with less vibration and a more favorable noise profile when compared to pneumatic dental drills.

== History ==
Kumar Patel made the first CO_{2} laser in 1964, in the same year the Nd:YAG Laser was invented at Bell Labs.

== See also ==
- Laser scalpel
- Laser surgery
- Soft-tissue laser surgery
- Air abrasion
