= Er:YAG laser =

Solid-state laser

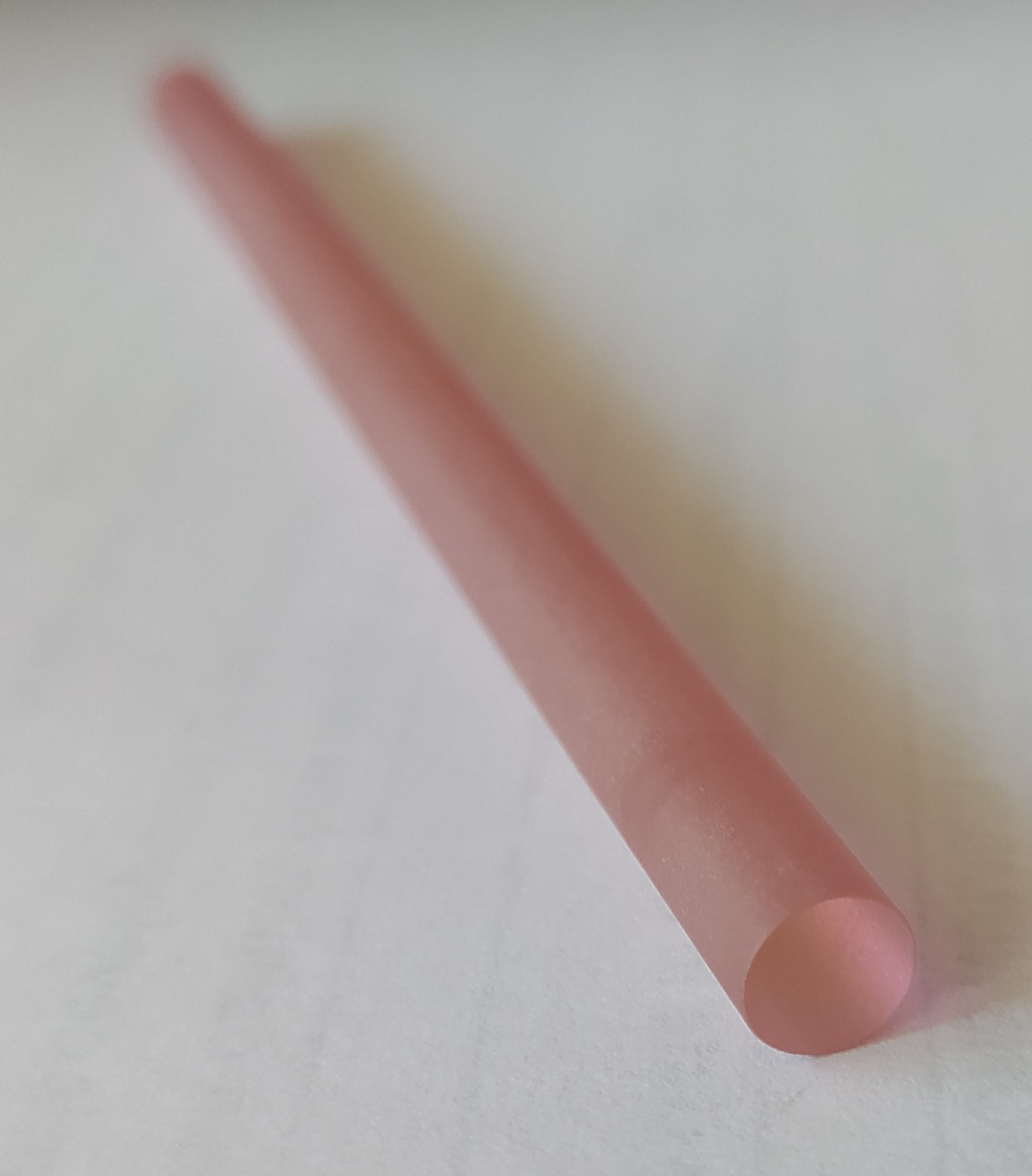
Er:YAG laser rod

An Er:YAG laser (erbium-doped yttrium aluminium garnet laser, erbium YAG laser) is a solid-state laser whose active laser medium is erbium-doped yttrium aluminium garnet (Er:Y_{3}Al_{5}O_{12}). Er:YAG lasers typically emit light with a wavelength of 2940 nm, which is infrared light.

== Applications ==
The output of an Er:YAG laser is strongly absorbed by water. As a result, they are widely used for medical procedures in which deep penetration of tissues is not desired.

Video of minor surgery using an Er:YAG laser

Erbium-YAG lasers have been used for laser resurfacing of human skin. Example uses include treating acne scarring, deep rhytides, and melasma. In addition to being absorbed by water, the output of Er:YAG lasers is also absorbed by hydroxyapatite, which makes it a good laser for cutting bone as well as soft tissue. Bone surgery applications have been found in oral surgery, dentistry, implant dentistry, and otolaryngology. Er:YAG lasers are safer for the removal of warts than carbon dioxide lasers because human papillomavirus (HPV) DNA is not found in the laser plume. Er:YAG lasers can be used in laser aided cataract surgery, but, owing to its water absorbable nature, Nd:YAG is preferred.

Erbium YAG dental lasers are effective for removing tooth decay atraumatically, often without the need for local anesthetic to numb the tooth. Eliminating the vibration of the dental drill removes the risk of causing microfractures in the tooth. When used initially at low power settings, the laser energy has a sedative effect on the nerve, resulting in the ability to subsequently increase the power without creating the sensation of pain in the tooth.
