= Nd:YAG laser =

Crystal used as a lasing medium for solid-state lasers

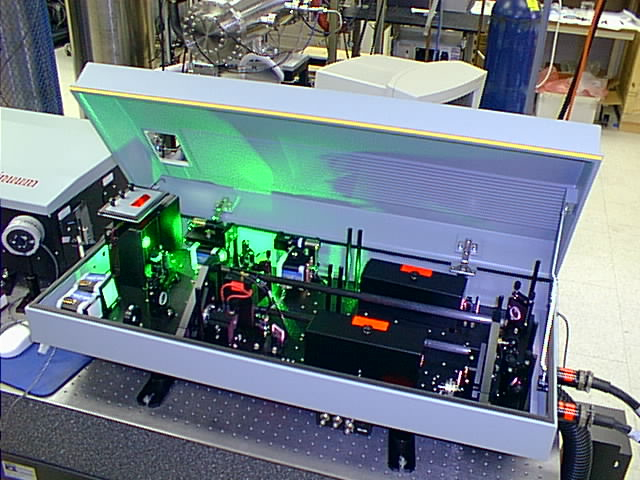
Nd:YAG laser with lid open showing frequency-doubled 532 nm green light

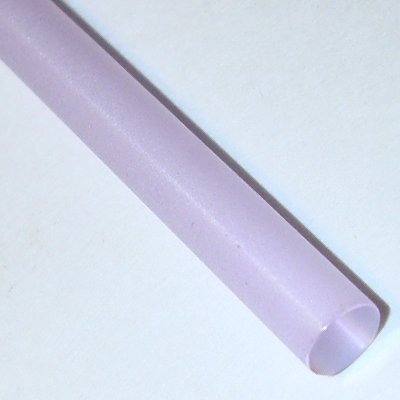
Nd:YAG laser rod

Nd:YAG (neodymium-doped yttrium aluminium garnet; Nd:Y_{3}Al_{5}O_{12}) is a crystal that is used as a lasing medium for solid-state lasers. The dopant, neodymium in the +3 oxidation state, Nd(III), typically replaces a small fraction (1%) of the yttrium ions in the host crystal structure of the yttrium aluminium garnet (YAG), since the two ions are of similar size. It is the neodymium ion which provides the lasing activity in the crystal, in the same fashion as the red chromium ion in ruby lasers.

Laser operation of Nd:YAG was first demonstrated by Joseph E. Geusic et al. at Bell Laboratories in 1964. Geusic and LeGrand Van Uitert received the Optical Society of America's R. W. Wood Prize in 1993 "for the discovery of the Nd:YAG laser and the demonstration of its usefulness as a practical solid state laser source".

== Technology ==
Neodymium ions in various types of ionic crystals, and also in glasses, act as a laser gain medium, typically emitting 1064 nm light from a particular atomic transition in the neodymium ion, after being "pumped" into excitation from an external source

Nd:YAG lasers are optically pumped using a flashtube or laser diodes. These are one of the most common types of laser, and are used for many different applications. Nd:YAG lasers typically emit light with a wavelength of 1064 nm, in the infrared. However, there are also transitions near 946, 1120, 1320, and 1440 nm. Nd:YAG lasers operate in both pulsed and continuous mode. Pulsed Nd:YAG lasers are typically operated in the so-called Q-switching mode: An optical switch is inserted in the laser cavity waiting for a maximum population inversion in the neodymium ions before it opens. Then the light wave can run through the cavity, depopulating the excited laser medium at maximum population inversion. In this Q-switched mode, output powers of 250 megawatts and pulse durations of 10 to 25 nanoseconds have been achieved. The high-intensity pulses may be efficiently frequency doubled to generate laser light at 532 nm, or higher harmonics at 355, 266 and 213 nm.

Nd:YAG absorbs mostly in the bands between 730 and 760 nm and 790–820 nm. At low current densities krypton flashlamps have higher output in those bands than do the more common xenon lamps, which produce more light at around 900 nm. The former are therefore more efficient for pumping Nd:YAG lasers.

The amount of the neodymium dopant in the material varies according to its use. For continuous wave output, the doping is significantly lower than for pulsed lasers. The lightly doped CW rods can be optically distinguished by being less colored, almost white, while higher-doped rods are pink-purplish.

YAG is the standard host for neodymium for various reasons: when doped with Nd^{3+}, the crystal lattice retains its structure and optical properties due to the ionic radii of Y^{3+} and Nd^{3+} only differing by 3%, limiting strain. Additionally, YAG has high thermal conductivity, allowing the crystal to withstand the heat of the laser operation without lattice distortion. YAG also exhibits suitable optical properties, as its cubic crystal structure narrows the emission bandwidth, thus increasing the overall laser efficiency.

Other common host materials for neodymium are: YLF (yttrium lithium fluoride, 1047 and 1053 nm), YVO_{4} (yttrium orthovanadate, 1064 nm), and glass. A particular host material is chosen in order to obtain a desired combination of optical, mechanical, and thermal properties. Nd:YAG lasers and variants are pumped either by flashtubes, continuous gas discharge lamps, or near-infrared laser diodes (DPSS lasers). Prestabilized laser (PSL) types of Nd:YAG lasers have proved to be particularly useful in providing the main beams for gravitational wave interferometers such as LIGO, VIRGO, GEO600 and TAMA.

== Applications ==
=== Medicine ===
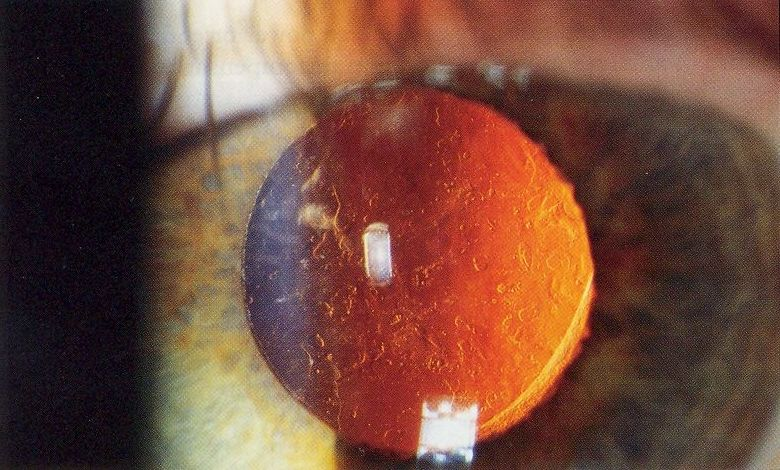
Slit lamp photograph of posterior capsular opacification visible a few months after implantation of intraocular lens in eye, seen on retroillumination

Nd:YAG lasers are used in ophthalmology to correct posterior capsular opacification, after cataract surgery, for peripheral iridotomy in patients with chronic and acute angle-closure glaucoma, where it has largely superseded surgical iridectomy, for the treatment of vitreous eye floaters, for pan-retinal photocoagulation in the treatment of proliferative diabetic retinopathy, and to damage the retina in ophthalmology animal research.

Nd:YAG lasers emitting light at 1064 nm have been the most widely used laser for laser-induced thermotherapy, in which benign or malignant lesions in various organs are ablated by the beam.

In oncology, Nd:YAG lasers can be used to remove skin cancers. They are also used to reduce benign thyroid nodules, and to destroy primary and secondary malignant liver lesions.

To treat benign prostatic hyperplasia (BPH), Nd:YAG lasers can be used for laser prostate surgery—a form of transurethral resection of the prostate.

These lasers are also used extensively in the field of cosmetic medicine for laser hair removal and the treatment of minor vascular defects such as spider veins on the face and legs. Nd:YAG lasers are also used to treat venous lake lip lesions. Recently Nd:YAG lasers have been used for treating dissecting cellulitis of the scalp, a rare skin disease.

Using hysteroscopy the Nd:YAG laser has been used for removal of uterine septa within the inside of the uterus.

In podiatry, the Nd:YAG laser is being used to treat onychomycosis, which is fungus infection of the toenail. The merits of laser treatment of these infections are not yet clear, and research is being done to establish effectiveness.

=== Dentistry ===
Nd:YAG dental lasers have been used for the removal of dental caries as an alternative to drill therapy, although evidence supporting its use is of low quality. They have also been used for soft tissue surgeries in the oral cavity, such as gingivectomy, periodontal sulcular debridement, LANAP, and pulpotomy. Nd:YAG dental lasers have also been shown to be effective at treating and preventing dental hypersensitivity, as an adjunct for periodontal instrumentation, and for the treatment of recurrent aphthous stomatitis.

=== Manufacturing ===
Nd:YAG lasers are used in manufacturing for engraving, etching, or marking a variety of metals and plastics, or for metal surface enhancement processes like laser peening. They are extensively used in manufacturing for cutting and welding steel, semiconductors and various alloys. For automotive applications (cutting and welding steel) the power levels are typically 1–5 kW. Super alloy drilling (for gas turbine parts) typically uses pulsed Nd:YAG lasers (millisecond pulses, not Q-switched). Nd:YAG lasers are also employed to make subsurface markings in transparent materials such as glass or acrylic glass and in white and transparent polycarbonate for identity documents. Lasers of up to 2 kW are used for selective laser melting of metals in additive layered manufacturing. In aerospace applications, they can be used to drill cooling holes for enhanced air flow/heat exhaust efficiency.

Nd:YAG lasers are also used in the non-conventional rapid prototyping process laser engineered net shaping (LENS).

Laser peening typically uses a high energy (10 to 40 joules) 10 to 30 nanosecond pulse. The laser beam is focused down to a few millimeters in diameter to deposit gigawatts of power on the surface of a part. Laser peening is unlike other manufacturing processes in that it neither heats nor adds material; it is a mechanical process of cold working the metallic component to impart compressive residual stresses. Laser peening is widely used in gas-fired turbine engines in both aerospace and power generation to increase strength and improve resistance to damage and metal fatigue.

=== Fluid dynamics ===
Nd:YAG lasers can be used for flow visualization techniques in fluid dynamics (for example particle image velocimetry or laser-induced fluorescence).

=== Biophysics ===
Nd:YAG lasers are frequently used to build optical tweezers for biological applications. This is because Nd:YAG lasers mostly emit at a wavelength of 1064 nm. Biological samples have a low absorption coefficient at this wavelength, as biological samples are usually mostly made up of water. As such, using an Nd:YAG laser minimizes the damage to the biological sample being studied.

=== Automotive ===
Researchers from Japan's National Institutes of Natural Sciences are developing laser igniters that use YAG chips to ignite fuel in an engine, in place of a spark plug. The lasers use several 800 picosecond-long pulses to ignite the fuel, producing faster and more uniform ignition. The researchers say that such igniters could yield better performance and fuel economy, with fewer harmful emissions.

=== Military ===
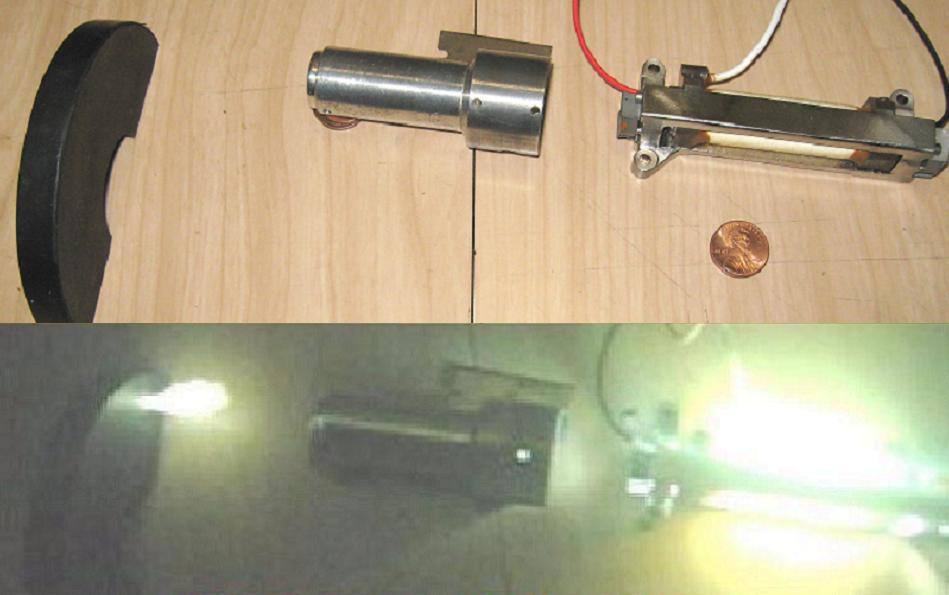
Military surplus Nd:YAG laser rangefinder firing. The laser fires through a collimator, focusing the beam, which blasts a hole through a rubber block, releasing a burst of plasma.

The Nd:YAG laser is the most common laser used in laser designators and laser rangefinders.

During the Iran–Iraq War, Iranian soldiers suffered more than 4000 cases of laser eye injury, caused by a variety of Iraqi sources including tank rangefinders. The 1064 nm wavelength of Nd:YAG is thought to be particularly dangerous, as it is invisible and initial exposure is painless.

The Chinese ZM-87 blinding laser weapon uses a laser of this type, though only 22 have been produced due to their prohibition by the Convention on Certain Conventional Weapons. North Korea is reported to have used one of these weapons against American helicopters in 2003.

=== Cavity ring-down spectroscopy (CRDS) ===
The Nd:YAG may be used in the application of cavity ring-down spectroscopy, which is used to measure the concentration of some light-absorbing substance.

=== Laser-induced breakdown spectroscopy (LIBS) ===
A range of Nd:YAG lasers are used in analysis of elements in the periodic table. Though the application by itself is fairly new with respect to conventional methods such as XRF or ICP, it has proven to be less time-consuming and a cheaper option to test element concentrations. A high-power Nd:YAG laser is focused onto the sample surface to produce plasma. Light from the plasma is captured by spectrometers and the characteristic spectra of each element can be identified, allowing concentrations of elements in the sample to be measured.

=== Laser pumping ===
Nd:YAG lasers, mainly via their second and third harmonics, are widely used to excite dye lasers either in the liquid or solid-state. They are also used as pump sources for vibronically broadened solid-state lasers such as Cr^{4+}:YAG or via the second harmonic for pumping Ti:sapphire lasers.

== Additional frequencies ==
For many applications, the infrared light is frequency-doubled or -tripled using nonlinear optical materials such as lithium triborate to obtain visible (532 nm, green) or ultraviolet light. Caesium lithium borate generates the 4th and 5th harmonics of the Nd:YAG 1064 nm fundamental wavelength. A green laser pointer is a frequency doubled Nd:YVO_{4} diode-pumped solid state laser (DPSS laser). Nd:YAG can be also made to lase at its non-principal wavelength. The line at 946 nm is typically employed in "blue laser pointer" DPSS lasers, where it is doubled to 473 nm.

== Physical and chemical properties of Nd:YAG ==
=== Properties of YAG crystal ===
- Formula: Y_{3}Al_{5}O_{12}
- Molecular weight: 596.7
- Crystal structure: Cubic
- Hardness: 8–8.5 (Mohs)
- Melting point: 1970 °C (3540 °F)
- Density: 4.55 g/cm^{3}

=== Refractive index of Nd:YAG ===
Wavelength (μm)	Index n (25 °C)
0.8	1.8245
0.9	1.8222
1.0	1.8197
1.2	1.8152
1.4	1.8121
1.5	1.8121

=== Properties of Nd:YAG at 25 °C (with 1% Nd doping) ===
- Formula: Y_{2.97}Nd_{0.03}Al_{5}O_{12}
- Weight of Nd: 0.725%
- Atoms of Nd per unit volume: 1.38×10^{20} /cm^{3}
- Charge state of Nd: 3^{+}
- Emission wavelength: 1064 nm
- Transition: ^{4}F_{3/2} → ^{4}I_{11/2}
- Duration of fluorescence: 230 μs
- Thermal conductivity: 0.14 W·cm^{−1}·K^{−1}
- Specific heat capacity: 0.59 J·g^{−1}·K^{−1}
- Thermal expansion: 6.9×10^{−6} K^{−1}
- dn/dT: 7.3×10^{−6} K^{−1}
- Young's modulus: 3.17×10^{4} K·g/mm^{−2}
- Poisson's ratio: 0.25
- Resistance to thermal shock: 790 W·m^{−1}

== References and notes ==
- Siegman, Anthony E. (1986). Lasers. University Science Books. ISBN 978-0-935702-11-8.
- Koechner, Walter (1988). Solid-State Laser Engineering (2nd ed.). Springer-Verlag. ISBN 978-3-540-18747-9.
