= Flashtube =

Incoherent light source

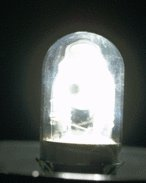
Helical xenon flashtube emitting greybody radiation as white light. (Animated version below.)

A flashtube (flashlamp) produces an electrostatic discharge with an extremely intense, incoherent, full-spectrum white light for a very short time. A flashtube is a glass tube with an electrode at each end and is filled with a gas that, when triggered, ionizes and conducts a high-voltage pulse to make light. Flashtubes are used most in photography; they also are used in science, medicine, industry, and entertainment.

== Construction ==
U-shaped xenon flashtube

The lamp consists of a hermetically sealed glass tube which is filled with a noble gas, usually xenon, and electrodes to carry electric current to the gas. Additionally, a high voltage power source is necessary to energize the gas as a trigger event. A charged photoflash capacitor is usually used to supply energy for the flash, so as to allow very speedy delivery of very high electrical current when the lamp is triggered.

=== Glass envelopes ===
The glass envelope is most commonly a thin tube, often made of fused quartz, borosilicate or Pyrex, which may be straight, or bent into a number of different shapes, including helical, "U" shape, and circular (to surround a camera lens for shadowless photography—'ring flashes'). In some applications, the emission of ultraviolet light is undesired, whether due to production of ozone, damage to laser rods, degradation of plastics, or other detrimental effects. In these cases, a doped fused silica is used. Doping with titanium dioxide can provide different cutoff wavelengths on the ultraviolet side, but the material suffers from solarization; it is often used in medical and sun-ray lamps and some non-laser lamps. A better alternative is a cerium-doped quartz; it does not suffer from solarization and has higher efficiency, as part of the absorbed ultraviolet is reradiated as visible via fluorescence. Its cutoff is at about 380 nm. Conversely, when ultraviolet is called for, a synthetic quartz is used as the envelope; it is the most expensive of the materials, but it is not susceptible to solarization and its cutoff is at 160 nm.

The power level of the lamps is rated in watts/area, total electrical input power divided by the lamp's inner wall surface. Cooling of the electrodes and the lamp envelope is of high importance at high power levels. Air cooling is sufficient for lower average power levels. High power lamps are cooled with a liquid, typically by flowing deionized water through a tube in which the lamp is encased. Water-cooled lamps will generally have the glass shrunk around the electrodes, to provide a direct thermal conductor between them and the cooling water. The cooling medium should flow also across the entire length of the lamp and electrodes. High average power or continuous-wave arc lamps must have the water flow across the ends of the lamp, and across the exposed ends of the electrodes as well, so the deionized water is used to prevent a short circuit. Above 15 W/cm^{2} forced air cooling is required; liquid cooling if in a confined space. Liquid cooling is generally necessary above 30 W/cm^{2}.

Thinner walls can survive higher average-power loads due to lower mechanical strain across the thickness of the material, which is caused by a temperature gradient between the hot plasma and cooling water, (e.g. 1 mm thick doped quartz has a limit of 160 W/cm^{2}, a 0.5 mm thick one has a limit of 320 W/cm^{2}). For this reason, thinner glass is often used for continuous-wave arc-lamps. Thicker materials can generally handle more impact energy from the shock wave that a short-pulsed arc can generate, so quartz as much as 1 mm thick is often used in the construction of flashtubes. The material of the envelope provides another limit for the output power; 1 mm thick fused quartz has a limit of 200 W/cm^{2}, synthetic quartz of same thickness can run up to 240 W/cm^{2}. Other glasses such as borosilicate generally have less than half the power loading capacity of quartz. Aging lamps require some derating, due to increased energy absorption in the glass due to solarization and sputtered deposits.

=== Electrodes and seals ===
The electrodes protrude into each end of the tube, and are sealed to the glass using a few different methods. "Ribbon seals" use thin strips of molybdenum foil bonded directly to the glass, which are very durable, but are limited in the amount of current that can pass through. "Solder seals" bond the glass to the electrode with a solder for a very strong mechanical seal, but are limited to low temperature operation. Most common in laser pumping applications is the "rod seal", where the rod of the electrode is wetted with another type of glass and then bonded directly to a quartz tube. This seal is very durable and capable of withstanding very high temperature and currents. The seal and the glass must have the same coefficient of thermal expansion.

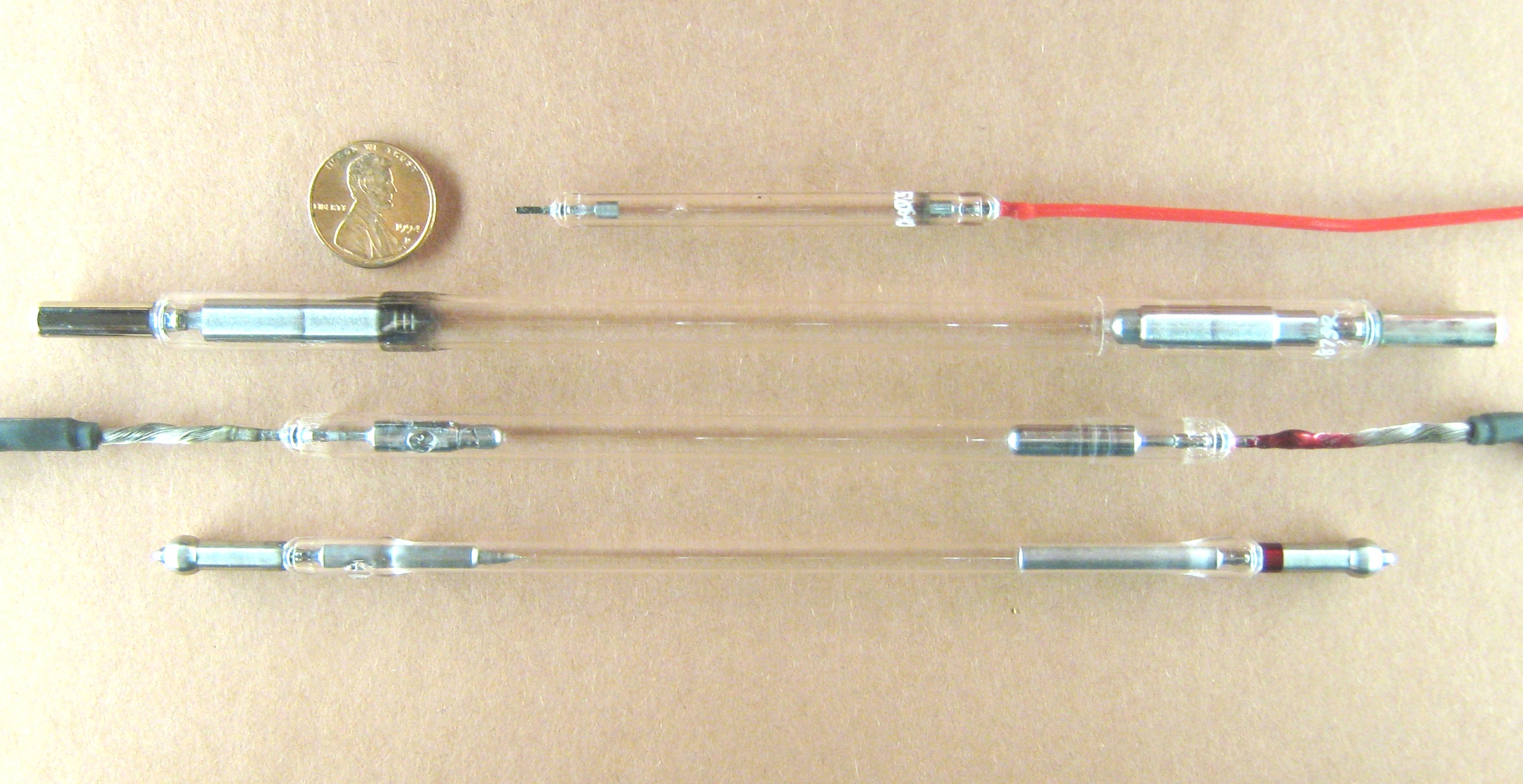
Flashtubes of various sizes for laser pumping. The top three are xenon flashtubes. The last one is a krypton arc lamp, (shown for comparison).

For low electrode wear the electrodes are usually made of tungsten, which has the highest melting point of any metal, to handle the thermionic emission of electrons. Cathodes are often made from porous tungsten filled with a barium compound, which gives low work function; the structure of cathode has to be tailored for the application. Anodes are usually made from pure tungsten, or, when good machinability is required, lanthanum-alloyed tungsten, and are often machined to provide extra surface area to cope with power loading. DC arc lamps often have a cathode with a sharp tip, to help keep the arc away from the glass and to control temperature. Flashtubes usually have a cathode with a flattened radius, to reduce the incidence of hot spots and decrease sputter caused by peak currents, which may be in excess of 1000 amperes. Electrode design is also influenced by the average power. At high levels of average power, care has to be taken to achieve sufficient cooling of the electrodes. While anode temperature is of lower importance, overheating the cathode can greatly reduce the lamp's life expectancy.

=== Gases and fill pressure ===
Depending on the size, type, and application of the flashtube, gas fill pressures may range from a few kilopascals to hundreds of kilopascals (0.01–4.0 atmospheres or tens to thousands of torr). Generally, the higher the pressure, the greater the output efficiency. Xenon is used mostly because of its good efficiency, converting nearly 50% of electrical energy into light. Krypton, on the other hand, is only about 40% efficient, but at low currents is a better match to the absorption spectrum of Nd:YAG lasers. A major factor affecting efficiency is the amount of gas behind the electrodes, or the "dead volume". A higher dead volume leads to a lower pressure increase during operation.

== Operation ==
This is a high-speed video of a xenon flashtube captured at over 44,000 frames per second. The single flash pulse in slow motion reveals a charged gas oscillation.

The electrodes of the lamp are usually connected to a capacitor, which is charged to a relatively high voltage (generally between 250 and 5000 volts), using a step up transformer and a rectifier. The gas, however, exhibits extremely high resistance, and the lamp will not conduct electricity until the gas is ionized. Once ionized, or "triggered", a spark will form between the electrodes, allowing the capacitor to discharge. The sudden surge of electric current quickly heats the gas to a plasma state, where electrical resistance becomes very low. There are two main methods of triggering, external and series.

=== External triggering ===
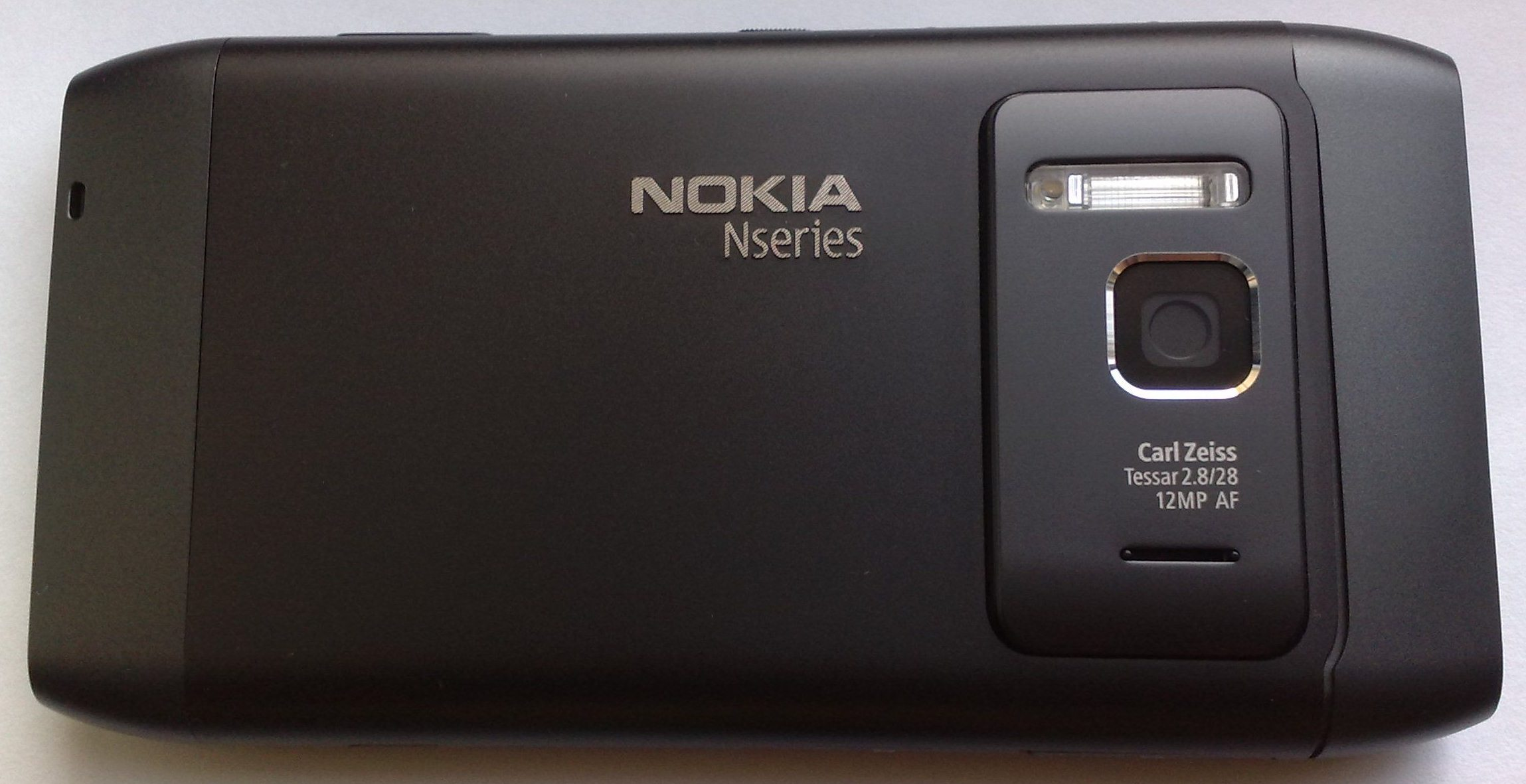
Xenon flashtubes used on smartphones and cameras are usually externally triggered.

External triggering is the most common method of operation, especially for photographic use. The electrodes are charged to a voltage high enough to respond to triggering, but below the lamp's self-flash threshold. An extremely high voltage pulse, (usually between 2000 and 150,000 volts), the "trigger pulse", is applied either directly to or very near the glass envelope. Water-cooled flashtubes sometimes apply this pulse directly to the cooling water, and often to the housing of the unit as well, so care must be taken with this type of system. The short, high voltage pulse creates a rising electrostatic field, which ionizes the gas inside the tube. The capacitance of the glass couples the trigger pulse into the envelope, where it exceeds the breakdown voltage of the gas surrounding one or both of the electrodes, forming spark streamers. The streamers propagate via capacitance along the glass at a speed of 1 centimeter in 60 nanoseconds (170 km/s). A trigger pulse must have a long enough duration to allow one streamer to reach the opposite electrode, or erratic triggering will result. The triggering can be enhanced by applying the trigger pulse to a "reference plane", which may be in the form of a metal band or reflector affixed to the glass, a conductive paint, or a thin wire wrapped around the length of the lamp. If the capacitor voltage is greater than the voltage drop between the cathode and the anode, when the internal spark streamers bridge the electrodes the capacitor will discharge through the ionized gas, heating the xenon to a high enough temperature for the emission of light.

=== Series triggering ===
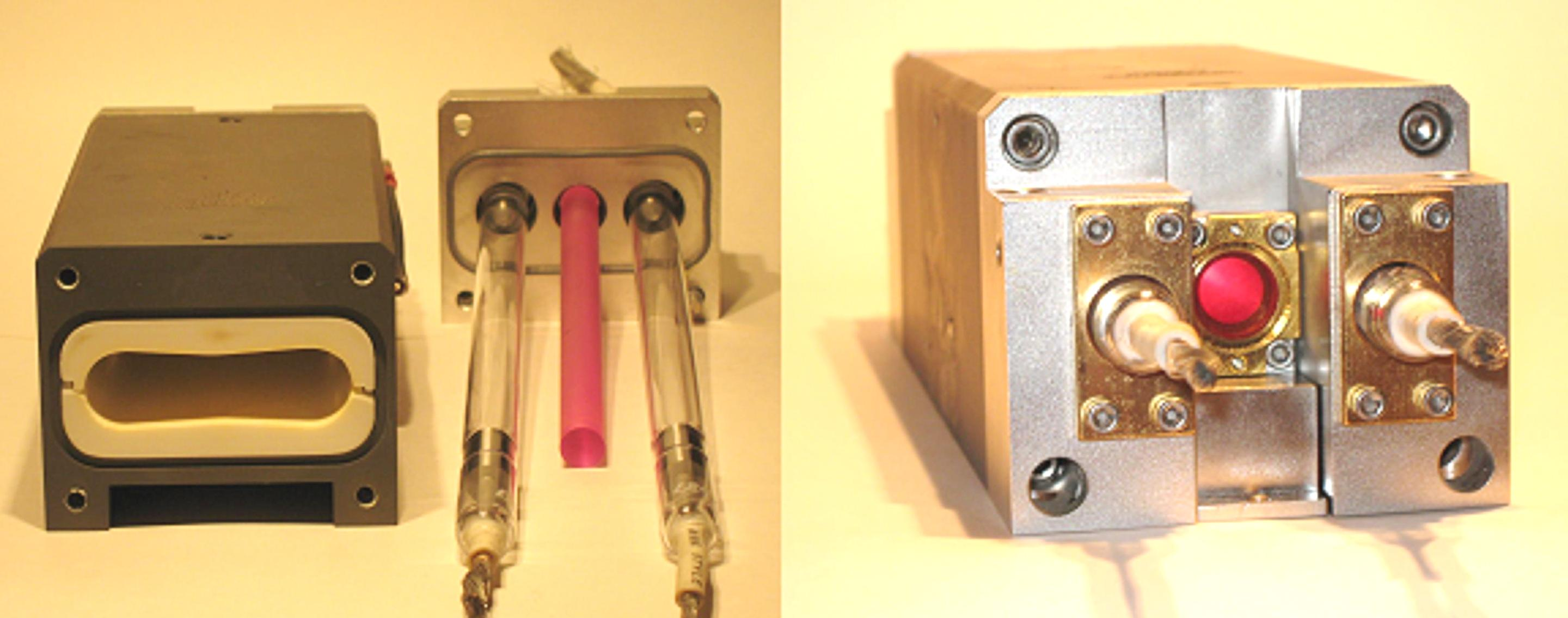
A ruby laser head, assembled and disassembled, revealing pumping cavity, the ruby rod, and two water-cooled flashtubes.

Series triggering, sometimes referred to as injection triggering, is more common in high powered, water-cooled flashtubes, such as those found in lasers. The high-voltage leads of the trigger-transformer are connected to the flashtube in series, (one lead to an electrode and the other to the capacitor), so that the flash travels through both the transformer and the lamp. The trigger pulse forms a spark inside the lamp, without exposing the trigger voltage to the outside of the lamp. The advantages are better insulation, more reliable triggering, and an arc that tends to develop well away from the glass, but at a much higher cost. The series-triggering transformer also acts as an inductor. This helps to control the flash duration, but prevents the circuit from being used in very fast discharge applications. The triggering can generally take place with a lower voltage at the capacitor than is required for external triggering. However, the trigger-transformer becomes part of the flash circuit, and couples the triggering-circuit to the flash energy. Therefore, because the trigger-transformer has very low impedance, the transformer, triggering-circuit, and silicon controlled rectifier (SCR) must be able to handle very high peak-currents, often in excess of 1500 amps.

=== Simmering ===
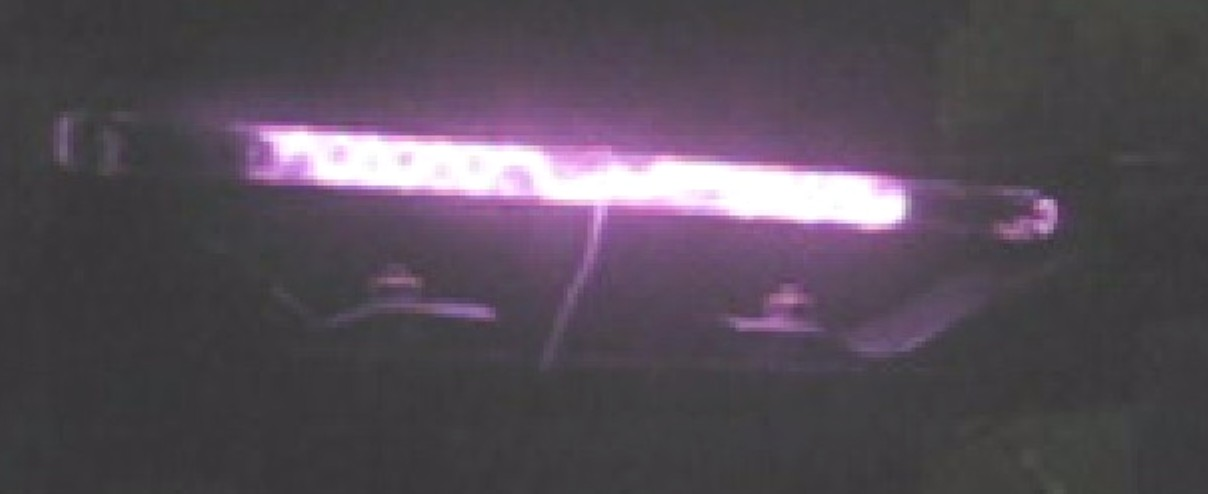
An externally triggered, 3.5 microsecond flash. The flash fully discharges before the arc can move away from the glass and fill the tube, causing excessive wear to the lamp.

Simmering is a technique commonly used in high frequency pulsed flashtube operation. After the flashtube is triggered and the gas is ionized, a low voltage, low current, stable DC arc is maintained. In a standard simmer circuit, the main pulse forming network(PFN) capacitor bank is connected directly to the flashtube electrodes. A high power solid-state switch, such as an SCR or IGBT, is used to hold back the current until the signal to fire is given. The simmering process is commonly used in high frequency applications due to the substantial increase in flashtube life and pulse to pulse optical stability.

=== Prepulse techniques ===
Very rapid rise-times are often achieved using a prepulse technique. This method is performed by delivering a small flash through the lamp just before the main flash. This flash is of much lower energy than the main flash (typically less than 10%) and, depending on the pulse duration, is delivered just a few thousandths to a few millionths of a second before the main flash. The prepulse heats the gas, producing a dim, short-lived afterglow that results from free electrons and ionized particles that remain after the pulse shuts down. If the main flash is initiated before these particles can recombine, this provides a good quantity of ionized particles to be used by the main flash. This greatly decreases the rise time. It also reduces the shock wave and makes less noise during operation, vastly increasing the lifetime of the lamp. It is especially effective on very fast-discharge applications, allowing the arc to expand faster and better fill the tube. It is very often used with simmer voltage and sometimes with series triggering, but rarely used with external triggering. Prepulse techniques are most commonly used in the pumping of dye lasers, greatly increasing the conversion efficiency. However, it has also been shown to increase the efficiency of other lasers with longer fluorescence lifetimes (allowing longer pulses), such as Nd:YAG or titanium sapphire, by creating pulses with almost square waveforms.

=== Ablative flashtubes ===
Ablative flashtubes are triggered by under-pressurizing. Ablative flashtubes are typically constructed using quartz tubing and one or both electrodes hollowed out, allowing a vacuum pump to be attached to control the gas pressure. The electrodes of the lamp are connected to a charged capacitor, and then the gas is vacuumed from the lamp. When the gas reaches a low enough pressure (often just a few torr) randomly-ionized particles are able to accelerate to velocities sufficient to begin ejecting electrons from the cathode as they impact its surface, resulting in a Townsend avalanche that causes the lamp to self-flash. At such low pressures, the efficiency of the flash would normally be very low. However, because of the low pressure, the particles have room to accelerate to very high speeds, and the magnetic forces expand the arc so that the bulk of its plasma becomes concentrated at the surface, bombarding the glass. The bombardment ablates (vaporizes) large amounts of quartz from the inner wall. This ablation creates a sudden, violent, localized increase in the internal pressure of the lamp, increasing the efficiency of the flash to very high levels. The ablation, however, causes extensive wear to the lamp, weakening the glass, and they typically need replacement after a very short lifetime.

Ablative flashtubes need to be refilled and vacuumed to the proper pressure for each flash. Therefore, they cannot be used for very high-repetition applications. Also, this usually precludes the use of very expensive gases like krypton or xenon. The most common gas used in an ablative flashtube is air, although sometimes cheap argon is also used. The flash usually must be very short to prevent too much heat from transferring to the glass. However, because nearly all the plasma is concentrated at the surface, the lamps have very low inductance and flashes can often be shorter than a normal lamp of comparative size. The flash from a single ablative flashtube can also be more intense than multiple lamps. For these reasons, the most common use for the lamps is for the pumping of dye lasers.

=== Variable pulse width control ===
In addition, an insulated-gate bipolar transistor (IGBT) can be connected in series with both the trigger transformer and the lamp, making adjustable flash durations possible. An IGBT used for this purpose must be rated for a high pulsed-current, so as to avoid over-current damage to the semiconductor junction. This type of system is used frequently in high average-power laser systems, and can produce pulses ranging from 500 microseconds to over 20 milliseconds. It can be used with any of the triggering techniques, like external and series, and can produce square wave pulses. It can even be used with simmer voltage to produce a "modulated" continuous wave output, with repetition rates over 300 hertz. With the proper large bore, water-cooled flashtube, several kilowatts of average-power output can be obtained.

=== Electrical requirements ===
The electrical requirements for a flashtube can vary, depending on the desired results. The usual method is to first determine the pulse duration, the maximum amount of energy tolerable at that duration (explosion energy), and the safe amount of operating energy. Then pick a current density that will emit the desired spectrum, and let the lamp's resistance determine the necessary combination of voltage and capacitance to produce it. The resistance in flashtubes varies greatly, depending on pressure, shape, dead volume, current density, time, and flash duration, and therefore, is usually referred to as impedance. The most common symbol used for lamp impedance is K_{o}, which is expressed as ohms per the square root of amps (ohms(amps^{0.5}).

K_{o} is used to calculate the amount of input voltage and capacitance needed to emit a desired spectrum, by controlling the current density. K_{o} is determined by the internal diameter, arc length, and gas type of the lamp and, to a lesser extent, by fill pressure. The resistance in flashtubes is not constant, but quickly drops as current density increases. In 1965, John H. Goncz showed that the plasma resistivity in flashtubes is inversely proportional to the square root of current density. As the arc develops, the lamp experiences a period of negative resistance, causing both the resistance and voltage to decrease as the current increases. This occurs until the plasma comes into contact with the inner wall. When this happens, the voltage becomes proportional to the square root of current, and the resistance in the plasma becomes stable for the remainder of the flash. It is this value which is defined as K_{o}. However, as the arc develops the gas expands, and calculations for K_{o} do not take into account the dead volume, which leads to a lower pressure increase. Therefore, any calculation of K_{o} is merely an approximation of lamp impedance.

== Output spectrum ==
=== Xenon ===
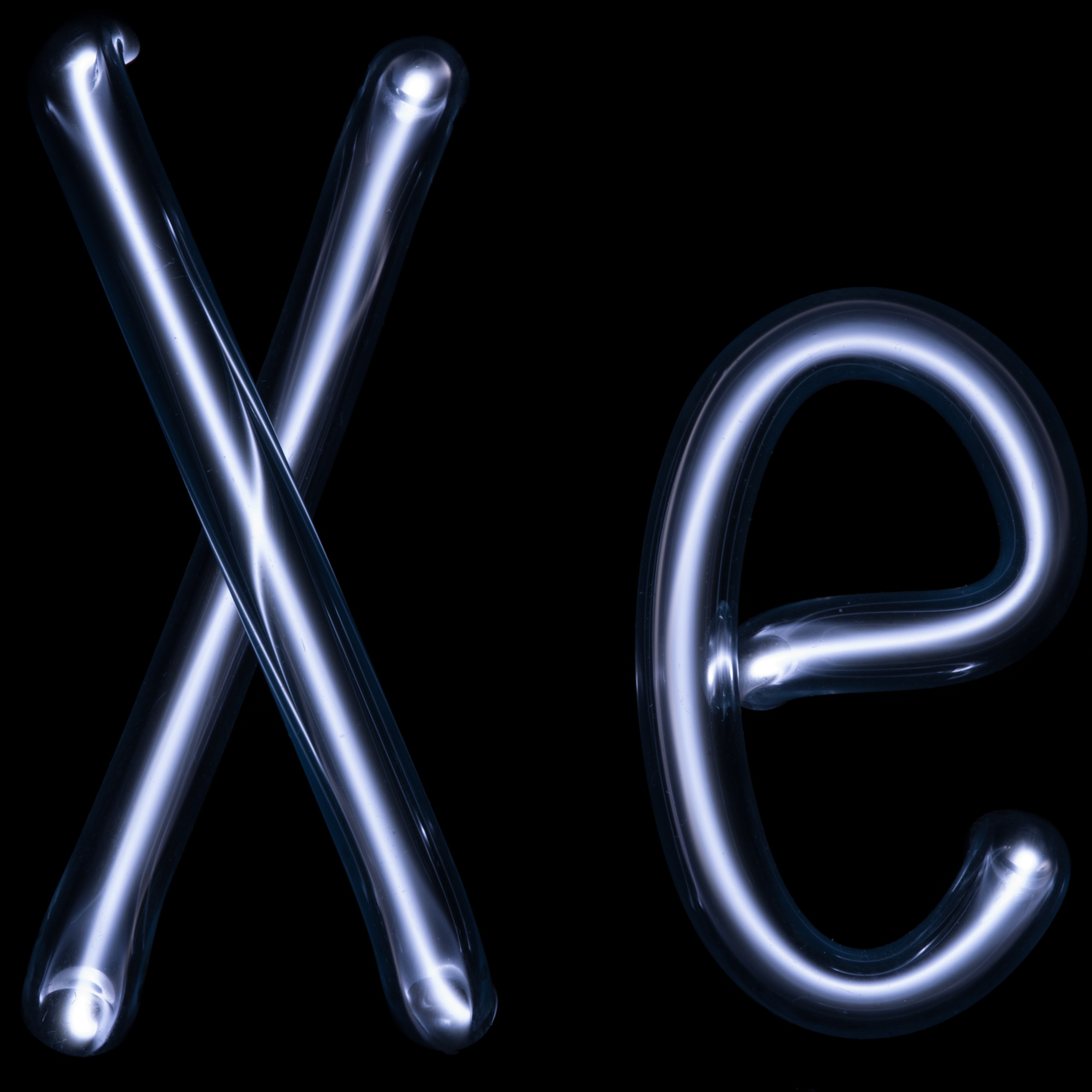
Xenon, operated as a 'neon light,' consists of a collection of mostly spectral lines, missing much of the continuum radiation needed for good color rendering.

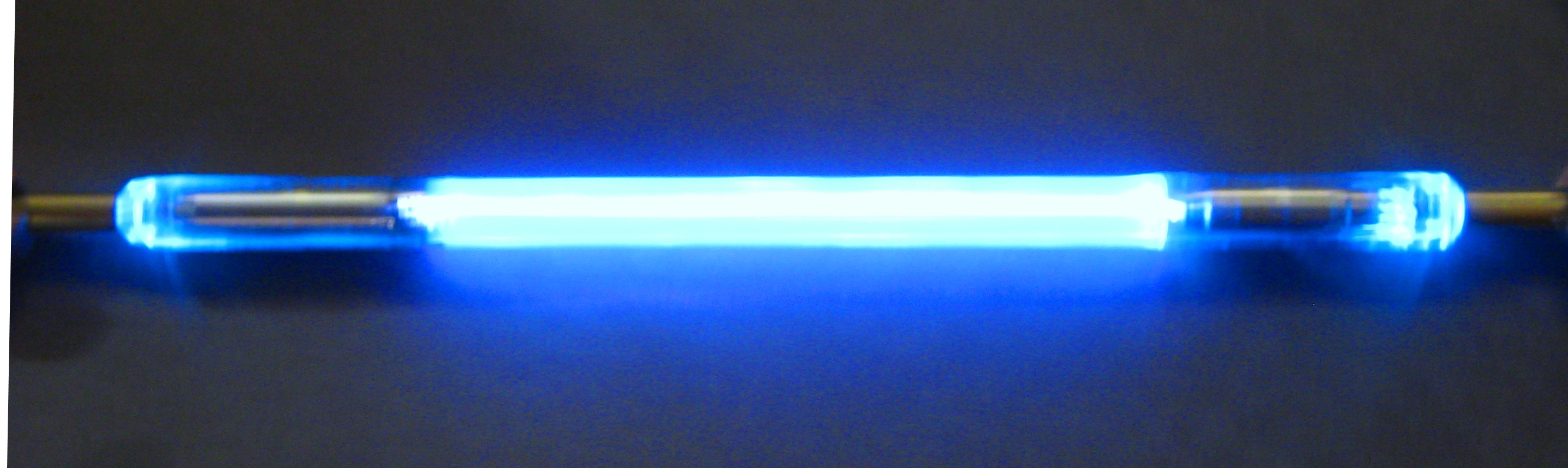
Spectral line radiation from a xenon flashlamp. The blue-green arc is similar to what the eye sees. Although invisible to the naked eye, the digital camera is able to image the strong IR spectral lines, which appear as the deep-blue light reflected off the table.

As with all ionized gases, xenon flashtubes emit light in various spectral lines. This is the same phenomenon that gives neon signs their characteristic color. However, neon signs emit red light because of extremely low current-densities when compared to those seen in flashtubes, which favors spectral lines of longer wavelengths. Higher current-densities tend to favor shorter wavelengths. The light from xenon, in a neon sign, likewise is rather violet.

The spectrum emitted by flashtubes is far more dependent on current density than on the fill pressure or gas type. Low current-densities produce narrow spectral-line emission, against a faint background of continuous radiation. Xenon has many spectral lines in the UV, blue, green, red, and IR portions of the spectrum. Low current densities produce a greenish-blue flash, indicating the absence of significant yellow or orange lines. At low current-densities, most of xenon's output will be directed into the invisible IR spectral lines around 820, 900, and 1000 nm. Low current-densities for flashtubes are generally less than 1000 A/cm^{2}.

Higher current-densities begin to produce continuum emission. Spectral lines broaden and become less dominant as light is produced across the spectrum, usually peaking, or "centered", on a certain wavelength. Optimum output-efficiency in the visual range is obtained at a density that favors "greybody radiation" (an arc that produces mostly continuum emission, but is still mostly translucent to its own light; an effect similar to sunlight when it passes through a cloud). For xenon, greybody radiation is centered near green, and produces the right combination for white light. Greybody radiation is produced at densities above 2400 A/cm^{2}.

Current densities that are very high, approaching 4000 A/cm^{2}, tend to favor black-body radiation. Spectral lines all but disappear as the continuum radiation dominates, and output center shifts toward the ultraviolet. As current densities become even higher, visually, xenon's output spectrum will begin to settle on that of a blackbody radiator with a color temperature of 9800 kelvins (a rather sky-blue shade of white). Except in cases where intense UV light is needed, such as water decontamination, blackbody radiation is usually not desired because the arc becomes opaque, and much of the radiation from within the arc can be absorbed before reaching the surface, impairing output efficiency.

Due to its high-efficiency, white output, xenon is used extensively for photographic applications, despite its great expense. In lasers, spectral-line emission is usually favored, as these lines tend to better match absorption lines of the lasing media. Krypton is also occasionally used. At low current-densities, krypton's spectral-line output in the near-IR range is better matched to the absorption profile of neodymium-based laser media than xenon emission, and very closely matches the narrow absorption-profile of Nd:YAG. None of xenon's spectral lines match Nd:YAG's absorption lines so, when pumping Nd:YAG with xenon, the continuum radiation must be used.

=== Krypton and other gases ===
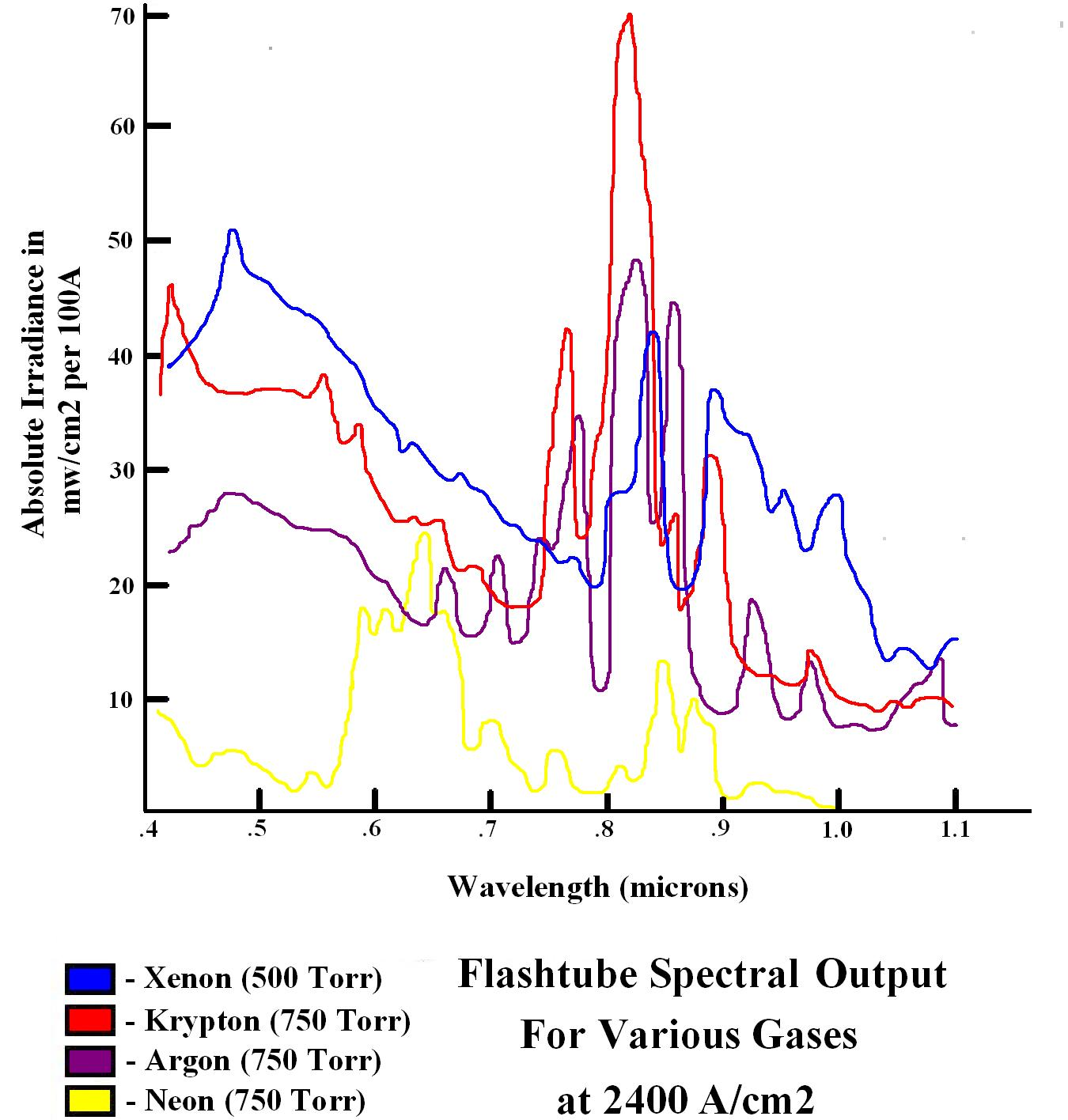
Spectral outputs of various gases at the current density where visual output nearly equals IR. Krypton has very few spectral lines in the near-IR, so most energy is directed into two main peaks.

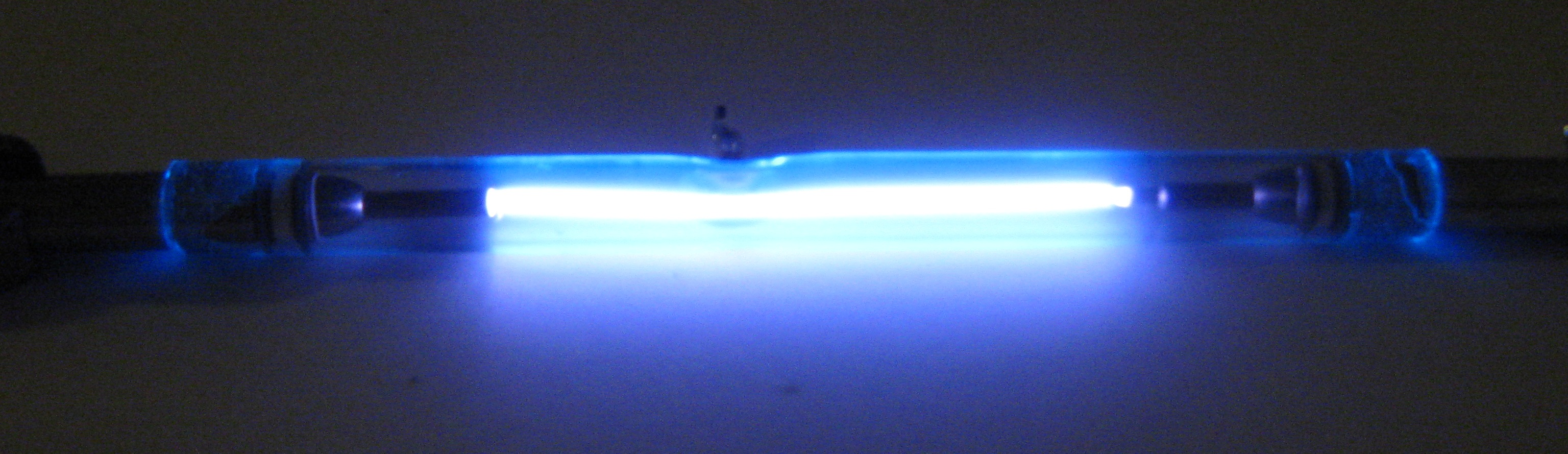
Argon flashlamp spectral line radiation. The texture of the table diffracts the light, allowing the camera to image the IR lines.

All gases produce spectral lines which are specific to the gas, superimposed on a background of continuum radiation. With all gases, low current-densities produce mostly spectral lines, with the highest output being concentrated in the near-IR between 650 and 1000 nm. Krypton's strongest peaks are around 760 and 810 nm. Argon has many strong peaks at 670, 710, 760, 820, 860, and 920 nm. Neon has peaks around 650, 700, 850, and 880 nm. As current densities become higher, the output of continuum radiation will increase more than the spectral-line radiation at a rate 20% greater, and output center will shift toward the visual spectrum. At greybody current-densities there is only a slight difference in the spectrum emitted by various gases. At very high current-densities, all gases will begin to operate as blackbody radiators, with spectral outputs resembling a blue giant star, centered in the UV.

Heavier gases exhibit higher resistance, and therefore, have a higher value for K_{o}. Impedance, being defined as the resistance required to change energy into work, is higher for heavier gases, and as such, the heavier gases are much more efficient than the lighter ones. Helium and neon are far too light to produce an efficient flash. Krypton can be as good as 40% efficient, but requires up to a 70% increase in pressure over xenon to achieve this. Argon can be up to 30% efficient, but requires an even greater pressure-increase. At such high pressures, the voltage drop between the electrodes, formed by the spark streamer, may be greater than the capacitor voltage. These lamps often need a "boost voltage" during the trigger phase, to overcome the extremely high trigger-impedance.

Nitrogen, in the form of air, has been used in flashtubes in home made dye lasers, but the nitrogen and oxygen present form chemical reactions with the electrodes, and themselves, causing premature wear and the need to adjust the pressure for each flash.

Some research has been done on mixing gases to alter the spectral output. The effect on the output spectrum is negligible, but the effect on efficiency is great. Adding a lighter gas will only reduce the efficiency of the heavier one.

=== Light production ===
Krypton arc plasma. The dark space near the anode is filled with free electrons that have been stripped from neutral atoms, ionizing the atoms. The ions then speed away from the anode, colliding with neutral atoms to produce the light.

As the current pulse travels through the tube, it ionizes the atoms, causing them to jump to higher energy-levels. Three types of particles are found within the arc plasma, consisting of electrons, positively ionized atoms, and neutral atoms. At any given time during the flash, the ionized atoms make up less than 1% of the plasma and produce all of the emitted light. As they recombine with their lost electrons they immediately drop back to a lower energy-state, releasing photons in the process. The methods of transferring energy occur in three separate ways, called "bound-bound", "free-bound", and "free-free" transitions.

Within the plasma, positive ions accelerate toward the cathode while electrons accelerate toward the anode. Neutral atoms move toward the anode at a slower rate, filling some localized pressure differential created by the ions. At normal pressures this motion is in very short distances, because the particles interact and bump into each other, and, exchanging electrons, they reverse direction. Thus, during the pulse neutral atoms are constantly ionizing and recombining, emitting a photon each time, relaying electrons from the cathode to the anode. The greater the number of ion transitions for each electron; the better the conversion efficiency will be, so longer tubes or higher pressures both help increase the efficiency of the lamp. During the pulse, skin effect causes free electrons to gather near the inner wall, creating an electron sheath around the plasma. This makes the area electro-negative and helps to keep it cool. The skin effect also increases inductance by inducing eddy currents in the central plasma.

Bound-bound transitions occur when the ions and neutral atoms collide, transferring an electron from the atom to the ion. This method predominates at low current-densities, and is responsible for producing the spectral-line emission. Free-bound transitions happen when an ion captures a free electron. This method produces the continuum emission, and is more prominent at higher current-densities. Some of the continuum is also produced when an electron accelerates toward an ion, called free-free transitions, producing bremsstrahlung radiation. Bremsstrahlung radiation increases with increasing energy density, and causes a shift toward the blue and ultraviolet end of the spectrum.

== Intensity and duration of flash ==
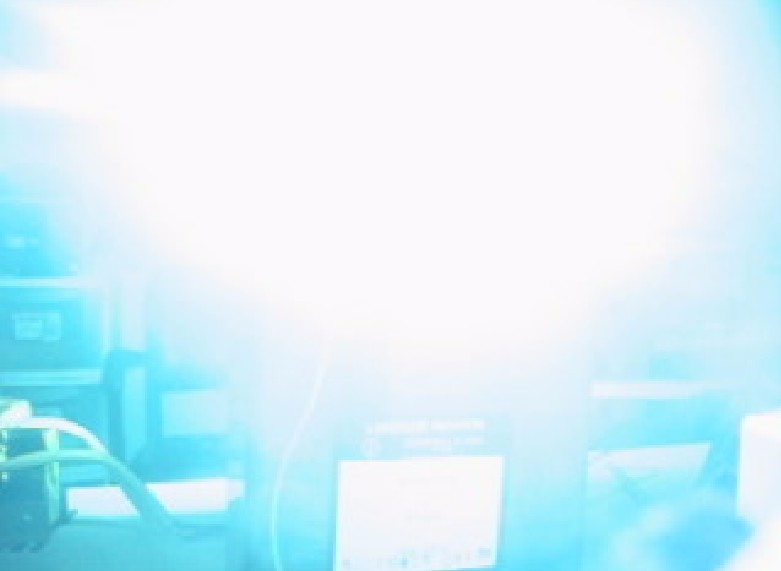
An 85 joule, 3.5 microsecond flash. While the energy level is moderately low, electrical power at such a short duration is 24 million watts. With an extremely high current-density, an arc temperature of 17,000 K (30,100 °F), and output centered at 170 nm (in the far UV), the blackbody radiation is so intense that it has no problem penetrating the extremely dark, shade 10 welding lens which the camera is behind.

The only real electrical-limit to how short a pulse can be is the total-system inductance, including that of the capacitor, wires, and lamp itself. Short-pulse flashes require that all inductance be minimized. This is typically done using special capacitors, the shortest wires available, or electrical-leads with a lot of surface area but thin cross-sections. For extremely fast systems, low-inductance axial-leads, such as copper tubing, plastic-core wires, or even hollowed electrodes, may be used to decrease the total-system inductance. Dye lasers need very short pulses and sometimes use axial flashtubes, which have an annular cross section with a large outer diameter, ring-shaped electrodes, and a hollow inner core, allowing both lower inductance and a dye cell to be placed like an axle through the center of the lamp.

In contrast, changes in the input voltage or capacitance have no effect on discharge time, although they do have an effect on current density. As flash duration decreases, the electrical energy becomes concentrated into shorter pulses, so the current density will increase. Compensating for this usually requires lowering the capacitance as pulse duration decreases, and then raising the voltage proportionately in order to maintain a high enough energy-level. However, as pulse duration decreases, so does the "explosion energy" rating of the lamp, so the energy level must also be decreased to avoid destroying the lamp.

The amount of power loading the glass can handle is the major mechanical limit. Even if the amount of energy (joules) that is used remains constant, electrical power (wattage) will increase in inverse proportion to a decrease in discharge time. Therefore, energy must be decreased along with the pulse duration, to keep the pulsed power levels from rising too high. Quartz glass (1 millimeter thick per 1 second discharge) can usually withstand a maximum of 160 watts per square centimeter of internal surface-area. Other glasses have a much lower threshold. Extremely fast systems, with inductance below critical damping (0.8 microhenries), usually require a shunt diode across the capacitor, to prevent current reversal (ringing) from destroying the lamp. If the pulse is allowed to ring through the lamp it will lengthen the flash, so the diode traps the ringing, allowing the lamp to shut down at the correct time.

The limits to long pulse durations are the number of transferred electrons to the anode, sputter caused by ion bombardment at the cathode, and the temperature gradients of the glass. Pulses that are too long can vaporize large amounts of metal from the cathode, while overheating the glass will cause it to crack lengthwise. For continuous operation the cooling is the limit. Discharge durations for common flashtubes range from 0.1 microsecond to tens of milliseconds, and can have repetition rates of hundreds of hertz. Flash duration can be carefully controlled with the use of an inductor.

The flash that emanates from a xenon flashtube may be so intense that it can ignite flammable materials within a short distance of the tube. Carbon nanotubes are particularly susceptible to this spontaneous ignition when exposed to the light from a flashtube. Similar effects may be exploited for use in aesthetic or medical procedures known as intense pulsed light (IPL) treatments. IPL can be used for treatments such as hair removal and destroying lesions or moles.

== Lifetime ==
The lifetime of a flashtube depends on both the energy level used for the lamp in proportion to its explosion energy, and on the pulse duration of the lamp. Failures can be catastrophic, causing the lamp to shatter, or they can be gradual, reducing the performance of the lamp below a usable rating.

=== Catastrophic failure ===
Catastrophic failure can occur from two separate mechanisms: energy and heat. When too much energy is used for the pulse duration, structural failure of the glass envelope can occur. Flashtubes produce an electrical arc flash contained in a glass tube. As the arc develops, a supersonic shock-wave forms, traveling radially from the center of the arc and impacting the inner wall of the tube. If the energy level is low enough, a tap against the glass is all that will be heard. However, if the energy level used equals the "explosion energy" rating of the lamp, the impacting shock wave will fracture the glass, rupturing the tube. The resulting explosion creates a loud, sonic shock-wave, and may throw shattered glass several feet. The explosion energy is calculated by multiplying the internal surface-area of the lamp, between the electrodes, with the power-loading capacity of the glass. Power loading is determined by the type and thickness of the glass, and the cooling method that is used. Power loading is measured in watts per centimeter squared. However, because the pulsed-power level increases as the flash duration decreases, the explosion energy must then be decreased in direct proportion to the square root of discharge time.

Failure from heat is usually caused by excessively long pulse-durations, high average-power levels, or inadequate electrode-size. The longer the pulse; the more of its intense heat will be transferred to the glass. When the inner wall of the tube gets too hot while the outer wall is still cold, this temperature gradient can cause the lamp to crack. Similarly, if the electrodes are not of a sufficient diameter to handle the peak currents they may produce too much resistance, rapidly heating up and thermally expanding. If the electrodes heat much faster than the glass, the lamp may crack or even shatter at the ends.

=== Gradual failure ===
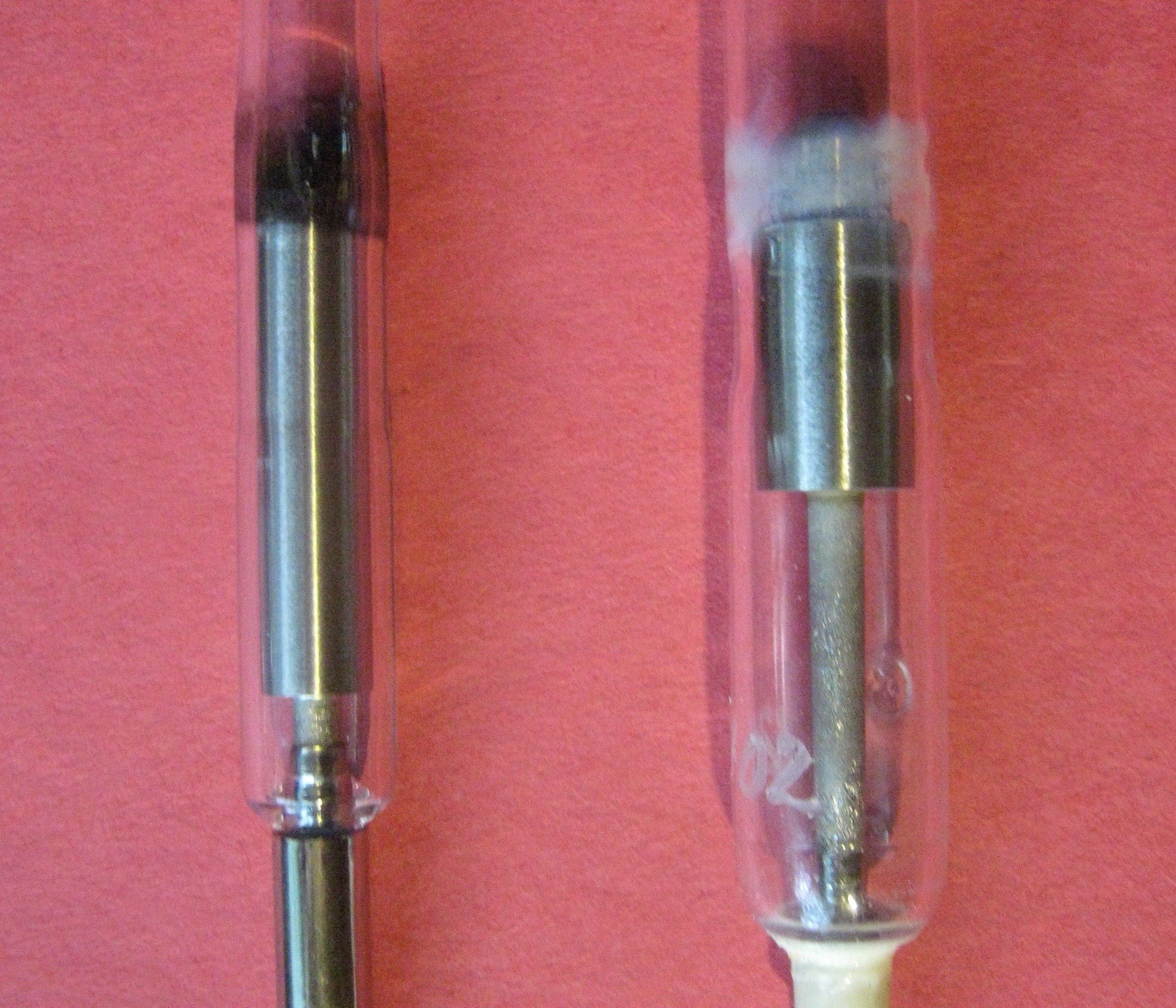
Flashtube cathodes, showing early signs of wear. The tube on the left shows sputter, while the tube on the right shows wall ablation.

The closer a flashtube operates to its explosion energy, the greater the risk becomes for catastrophic failure. At 50% of the explosion energy, the lamp may produce several thousand flashes before exploding. At 60% of the explosion energy, the lamp will usually fail in less than a hundred. If the lamp is operated below 30% of the explosion energy the risk of catastrophic failure becomes very low. The methods of failure then become those that reduce the output efficiency and affect the ability to trigger the lamp. The processes affecting these are sputter and ablation of the inner wall.

Sputter occurs when the energy level is very low, below 15% of the explosion energy, or when the pulse duration is very long. Sputter is the vaporization of metal from the cathode, which is redeposited on the walls of the lamp, blocking the light output. Because the cathode is more emissive than the anode, the flashtube is polarized, and connecting the lamp to the power source incorrectly will quickly ruin it. However, even if connected properly, the degree of sputter may vary considerably from lamp to lamp. Therefore, it is impossible to predict the lifetime accurately at low energy-levels.

At higher energy-levels, wall ablation becomes the main process of wear. The electrical arc slowly erodes the inner wall of the tube, forming microscopic cracks that give the glass a frosted appearance. The ablation releases oxygen from the glass, increasing the pressure beyond an operable level. This causes triggering problems, known as "jitter." Above 30%, the ablation may cause enough wear to rupture the lamp. However, at energy levels greater than 15%, the lifetime can be calculated with a fair degree of accuracy.

When operated below 30% of the explosion energy, flashtube lifetime is generally between a few million to tens of millions of flashes.

== Applications ==
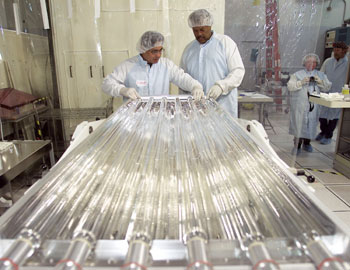
The 6 foot (180 cm) flashtubes used on the National Ignition Facility laser were some of the largest in commercial production, operating at 30 kJ input energy per pulse.

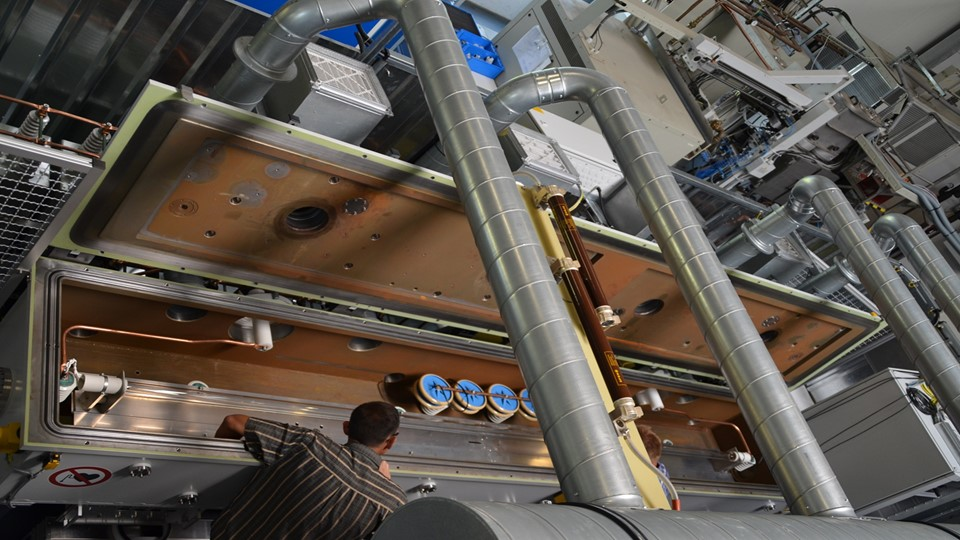
A flashtube (lower half of image) with a length of 12.5 feet (380 cm), (12 foot (372 cm) arc length), for substrate annealing.

As the duration of the flash that is emitted by a xenon flashtube can be accurately controlled, and due to the high intensity of the light, xenon flashtubes are commonly used as photographic strobe lights. Xenon flashtubes are also used in very high-speed or "stop-motion" photography, which was pioneered by Harold Edgerton in the 1930s. Because they can generate bright, attention-getting flashes with a relatively small, continuous input of electrical power, they are also used in aircraft warning lights, emergency vehicle lighting, fire alarm notification appliances, aircraft anticollision beacons, and other similar applications.

In dentistry it is used in "light box" devices to light-activate the hardening of various restorative and auxiliary light-curing resins (for example: Megaflash mini, Uni XS and other devices).

Due to their high intensity and relative brightness at short wavelengths (extending into the ultraviolet) and short pulse widths, flashtubes are also ideally suited as light sources for pumping atoms in a laser to excited states where they can be stimulated to emit coherent, monochromatic light. Proper selection of both the filler gas and current density is crucial, so that the maximum radiated output-energy is concentrated in the bands that are the best absorbed by the lasing medium; e.g. krypton flashtubes are more suitable than xenon flashtubes for pumping Nd:YAG lasers, as krypton emission in near infrared is better matched to the absorption spectrum of Nd:YAG.

Xenon flashtubes have been used to produce an intense flash of white light, some of which is absorbed by Nd:glass that produces the laser power for inertial confinement fusion. In total about 1 to 1.5% of the electrical power fed into the flashtubes is turned into useful laser light for this application.

Pulsed light (PL) is a technique to decontaminate surfaces by killing microorganisms using pulses of an intense broad spectrum, rich in UV-C light. UV-C is the portion of the electromagnetic spectrum corresponding to the band between 200 and 280 nm. Pulsed light works with xenon lamps that can produce flashes several times per second. Disinfection robots use pulsed UV light.

A recent application of flashlamps is photonic curing.

== History ==
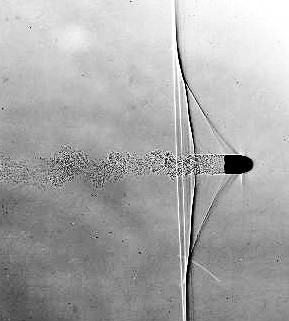
This shadowgraph of a bullet in supersonic flight was taken at the Edgerton Center (Strobe Alley, MIT), using a discharge from a high-speed flashtube

The flashtube was invented by Harold Edgerton in the 1930s as a means to take sharp photographs of moving objects. Flashtubes were mainly used for strobe lights in scientific studies, but eventually began to take the place of chemical and powder flashbulbs and flash lamps in mainstream photography.

Because electrical arcs could be made that were much faster than mechanical-shutter speeds, early high-speed photographs were taken with an open-air, electrical-arc discharge, called spark photography, helping to remove blur from moving objects. This was typically done with the shutter locked open while in a dark or dimly lit room, to avoid overexposing the film, and a method of timing the flash to the event to be photographed. The earliest known use of spark photography began with Henry Fox Talbot around 1850. In 1886, Ernst Mach used an open-air spark to photograph a speeding bullet, revealing the shockwaves it produced at supersonic speeds. Open-air spark systems were fairly easy to build, but were bulky, very limited in light output, and produced loud noises comparable to that of a gunshot.

In 1927, Harold Edgerton built his first flash unit while at the Massachusetts Institute of Technology. Wanting to photograph the motion of a motor in vivid detail, without blur, Edgerton decided to improve the process of spark photography by using a mercury-arc rectifier, instead of an open-air discharge, to produce the light. He was able to achieve a flash duration of 10 microseconds, and was able to photograph the moving motor as if "frozen in time."

His colleague's interest in the new flash apparatus soon provoked Edgerton to improve upon the design. The mercury lamp's efficiency was limited by the coolest part of the lamp, causing them to perform better when very hot but poorly when cold. Edgerton decided to try a noble gas instead, feeling that it would not be as temperature dependent as mercury, and, in 1930, he employed the General Electric company to construct some lamps using argon instead. The argon tubes were much more efficient, were much smaller, and could be mounted near a reflector, concentrating their output. Slowly, camera designers began to take notice of the new technology and began to accept it. Edgerton received his first major order for the strobes from the Kodak company in 1940. Afterward, he discovered that xenon was the most efficient of the noble gases, producing a spectrum very close to that of daylight, and xenon flashtubes became standard in most large photography sets. It was not until the 1970s that strobe units became portable enough to use in common cameras.

In 1960, after Theodore Maiman invented the ruby laser, a new demand for flashtubes began for use in lasers, and new interest was taken in the study of the lamps.

== Safety ==
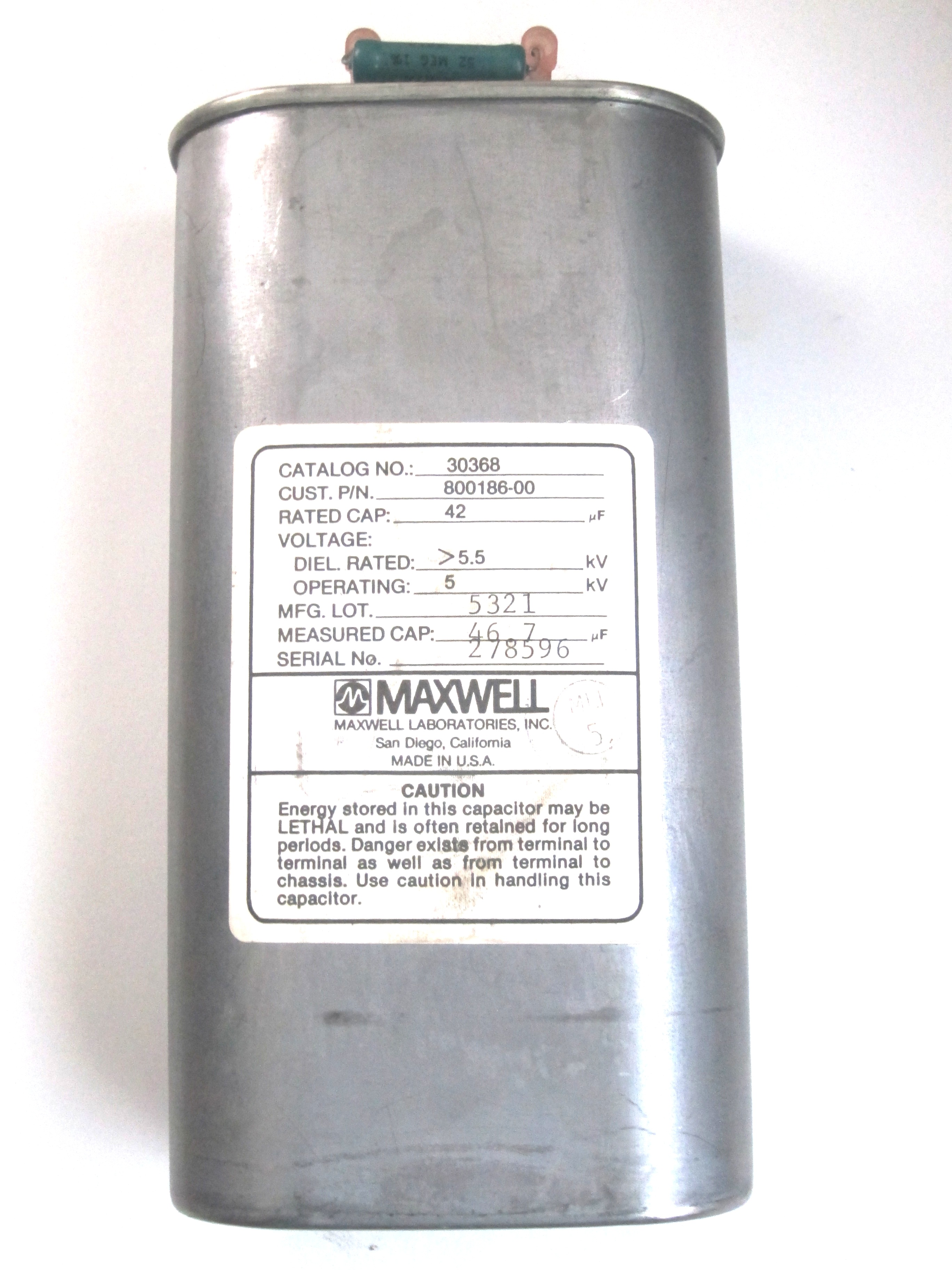
This 525 joule capacitor is one of a pair adapted for use in a ruby laser, and carries a warning of its deadly storage capacity. A resistor is connected between the terminals to prevent the capacitor retaining a dangerous charge when not in operation.

Flashtubes operate at high voltages, with currents high enough to be deadly. Under certain conditions, shocks as low as 1 joule have been reported to be lethal. The energy stored in a capacitor can remain surprisingly long after power has been disconnected. A flashtube will usually shut down before the capacitor has fully drained, and it may regain part of its charge through a process called "dielectric absorption". In addition, some types of charging systems can be equally deadly themselves. The trigger voltage can deliver a painful shock, usually not enough to kill, but which can often startle a person into bumping or touching something more dangerous. When a person is charged to high voltages a spark can jump, delivering the high capacitor current without actually touching anything.

Flashtubes operate at high pressures and are known to explode, producing violent shockwaves. The "explosion energy" of a flashtube (the amount of energy that will destroy it in just a few flashes) is well defined, and to avoid catastrophic failure, it is recommended that no more than 30% of the explosion energy be used. Flashtubes should be shielded behind glass or in a reflector cavity. If not, eye and ear protection should be worn.

Flashtubes produce very intense flashes, often faster than the eye can register, and may not appear as bright as they are. Quartz glass will transmit nearly all of the long and short wave UV, including the germicidal wavelengths, and can be a serious hazard to eyes and skin. This ultraviolet radiation can also produce large amounts of ozone, which can be harmful to people, animals, and equipment.

Many compact cameras charge the flash capacitor immediately after power-up, and some even just by inserting the batteries. Merely inserting the battery into the camera can prime the capacitor to become dangerous or at least unpleasant for up to several days. The energy involved is also fairly significant; a 330 microfarad capacitor charged to 300 volts (common ballpark values found in cameras) stores almost 15 joules of energy.

== Popular culture ==
In the 1969 book The Andromeda Strain and the 1971 motion picture, specialized exposure to a xenon flash apparatus was used to burn off the outer epithelial layers of human skin as an antiseptic measure to eliminate all possible bacterial access for persons working in an extreme, ultraclean environment. (The book used the term 'ultraflash'; the movie identified the apparatus as a 'xenon flash'.)

== Animation ==
Helical xenon flashtube being fired

Frame 1: The tube is dark.

Frame 2: The trigger pulse ionizes the gas, glowing with a faint, blue light. Spark streamers form from each electrode, moving toward each other along the inner surface of the glass tube.

Frame 3: Spark streamers connect and move away from the glass, and a plasma tunnel forms allowing current to surge.

Frame 4: Capacitor current begins to run away, heating the surrounding xenon.

Frame 5: As resistance decreases voltage drops and current fills the tube, heating the xenon to a plasma state.

Frame 6: Fully heated, resistance and voltage stabilize into an arc and the full current load rushes through the tube, causing the xenon to emit a burst of light.

== See also ==
- Air-gap flash
- Flash (photography)
- List of light sources
- Strobe beacon
- Strobe light
- Xenon arc lamp
