= Lewis Grigsby =

L. E. Grigsby
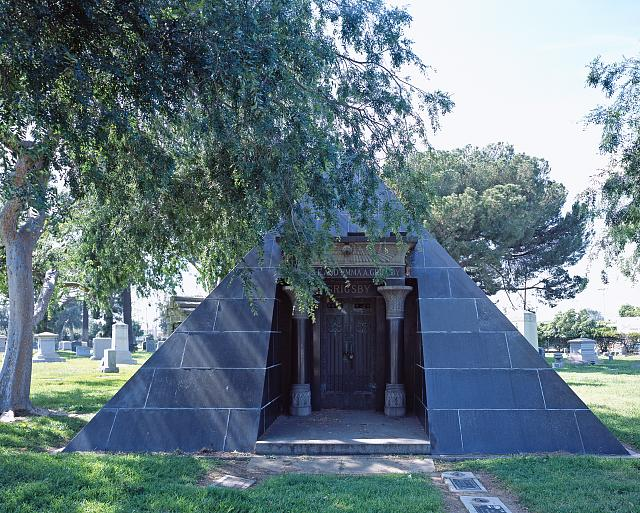
- Black granite pyramid-shaped mausoleum of Lewis Eugene Grigsby and his wife Emma Alvina Miller Grigsby in Angelus-Rosedale Cemetery in Los Angeles, California
- Born: Lewis Eugene Grigsby; June 22, 1867; Winchester, Clark County, Kentucky, US
- Died: February 4, 1932 (aged 64); Los Angeles, California, US
- Occupation: Real Estate Investor
- Years active: 1895-1920

Lewis Eugene Grigsby (born June 22, 1867) was a real estate investor, philanthropist and world traveler. He died in Los Angeles, California on February 4, 1932, at the age of 64.

== Early life ==
Born in Winchester, Clark County, Kentucky, Grigsby's parents were James Lewis Grigsby and Louisa C. Cravens.

== Professional life ==
L. E. Grigsby as he was known professionally was a real estate investor in California. He started a project to build the ten story Grigsby Grand Hotel on Ocean Boulevard and Locust Avenue in Long Beach, California. He was one of the first few thousand people in California to get an automobile license in 1907. He was a trustee for the city of Pomona in the California League of Municipalities in 1902. He toured beach resorts as possible investment sites. Grigsby was a councilman for the fifth ward of Pomona in 1901.

== Personal life ==
Grigsby married Emma Alvina Miller (1868-1930) in 1895. They had one child who died very young before 1910. They lived at 1473 W Adams Blvd, Los Angeles, California in an 1895 Victorian home.

Emma's parents were Ohio lithographer Ewald Miller and Louise. Emma was previously married to Bernard Hermann Gueterbock (1847-1893) on September 27, 1877, in Hamilton, Ohio. Gueterbock was the editor of the New York Staats Zeitung newspaper. Gueterbock committed suicide May 1893. Initially Emma was arrested and jailed along with her servant and a custom house broker without bond. She was released when the coroner ruled it a suicide.

Together L. E. Grigsby and his wife Emma traveled the world visiting Egypt, The Holy Land, New Orleans, New York, Philadelphia, Atlantic City, Washington D.C., White Suplhur Springs, Virginia, Kentucky, Cincinnati, Ohio, West Baden, Indiana, San Francisco, Portland, Seattle and Alaska. Grigsby was also a philanthropist donating the then $13,500 Chimes to the Wilshire Boulevard Christian Church on Wilshire and Normandie. A bronze tablet was placed with the inscription "Those chimes dedicated to the glory of God" with the Grigsby name inscribed.

Grigsby was also a Saddle-Horse breeder while in Pomona. He bred "Rex Grigsby" a black stallion foaled May 30, 1899. He was also a member of the Claremont Pomological Club-Citrus Growers Club in 1921 which frequently met at their home. Grigsby started The Kingsley Tract Water Col, Limited corporation in Pomona.

L. E. Grigsby and his wife are buried in Angelus-Rosedale Cemetery in Los Angeles, California in a black granite pyramid mausoleum.
