= Valentin Wolfenstein =

Swedish-American photographer

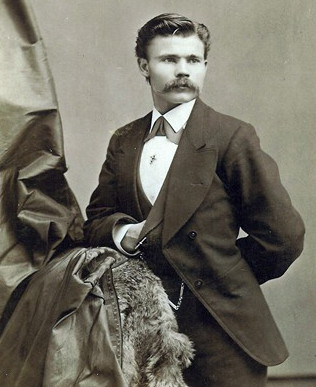
- Valentin Wolfenstein, circa 1880
- Born: 19 April 1845; Falun, Sweden
- Died: 3 February 1909 (aged 63); Los Angeles, US
- Other names: August Valentin Wolfenstein; Valentine Wolfenstein
- Occupation: Photographer
- Known for: Flash photography

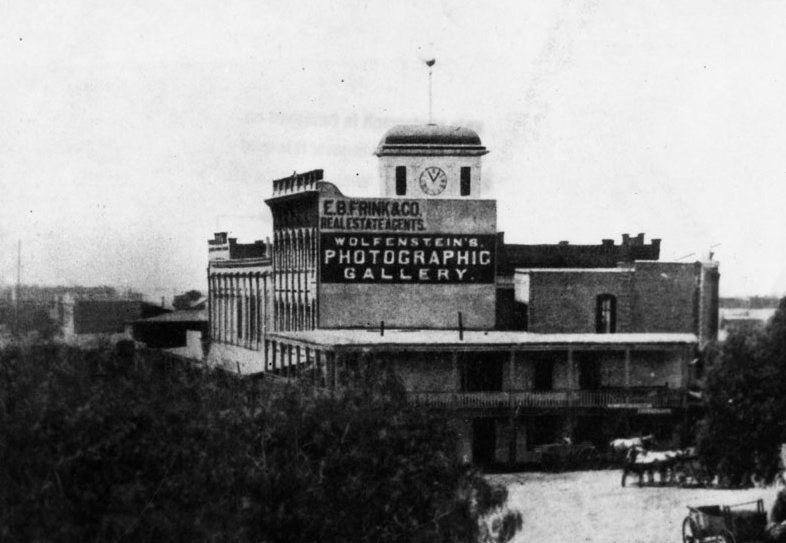
Wolfenstein's Los Angeles photography studio on Main Street, circa 1869

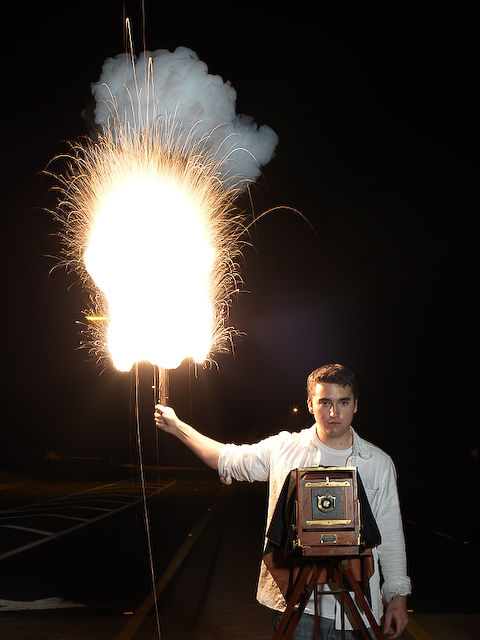
Flash-lamp photography

Valentin Wolfenstein (19 April 1845 – 3 February 1909) was a Swedish-American photographer who worked both in Stockholm and Los Angeles, California. He was one of the first photographers to use flash-lamps for photography.

He owned the first successful photography studio in Los Angeles where he photographed many famous Californians in the 1870s in 1880s.

After returning to Sweden, Wolfenstein owned Atelier Jaeger, the official court photographer's studio in Stockholm, from 1890 to 1905.

== Mid-life ==
He returned to Sweden in the 1890s, sometime after Clara died, and settled in Stockholm, where he became an employee of the royal photographer Johannes Jaeger at his studio, Atelier Jaeger. In the 1890s, Wolfenstein established a photographic studio at Drottninggatan 33 in Stockholm. When Jaeger moved back to Germany, his home country, Wolfenstein bought both of his studios for 60,000 kronor. Wolfenstein continued to call the studio of 30 employees by its original name "Atelier Jaeger", because of its already established reputation as the official court photographer.

== Later life and death ==
Wolfenstein sold Atelier Jaeger in 1905 and returned to the United States. Albin Roosval and Herman Sylwander, who took over his studios, kept the same original name for the studio.

Wolfenstein died in Los Angeles on 3 February 1909 at the age of 63. He is buried at Angelus-Rosedale Cemetery in Central Los Angeles.

== Photography work ==
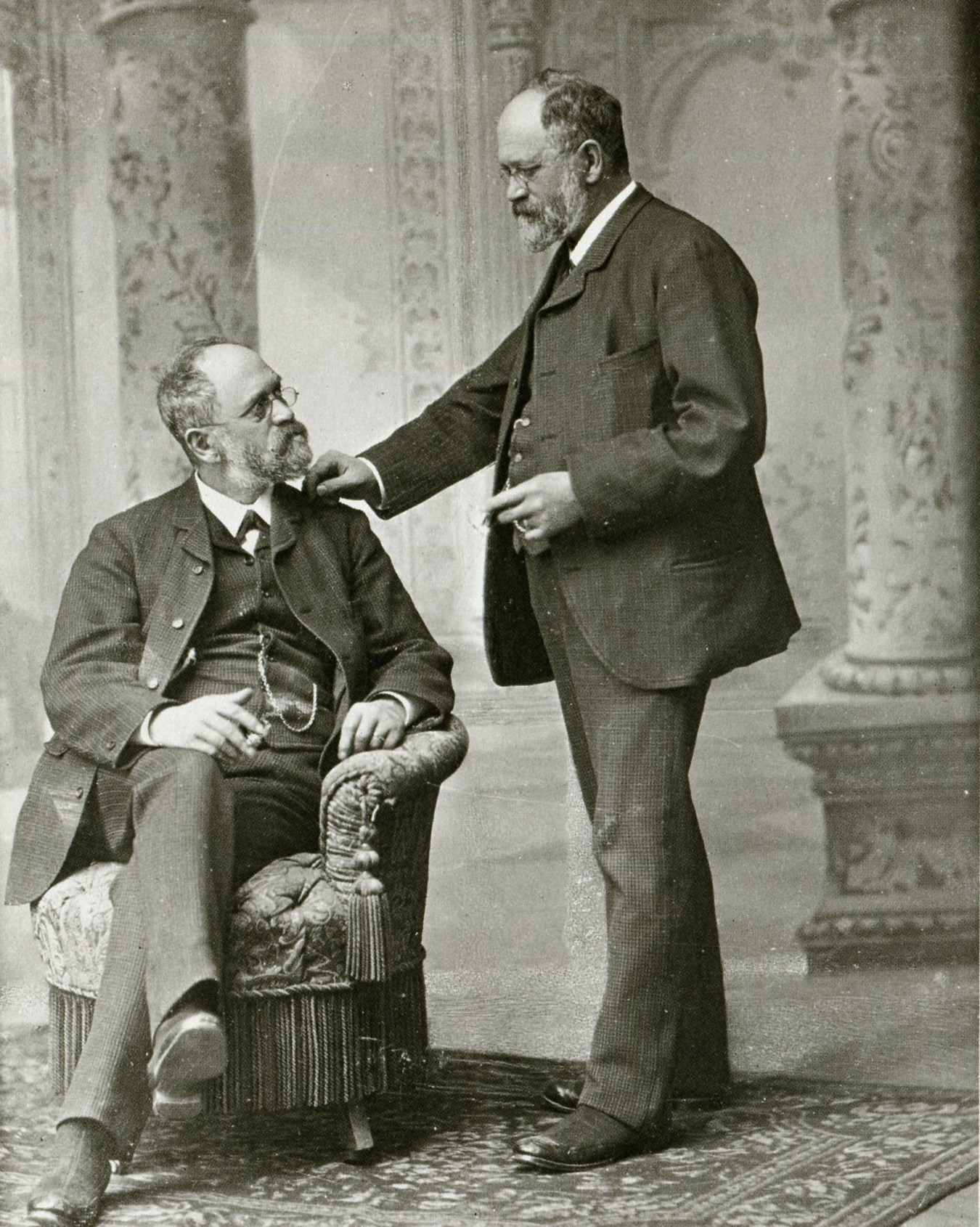
Wolfenstein's "look-alike"
of his boss John Jaeger
sitting and standing

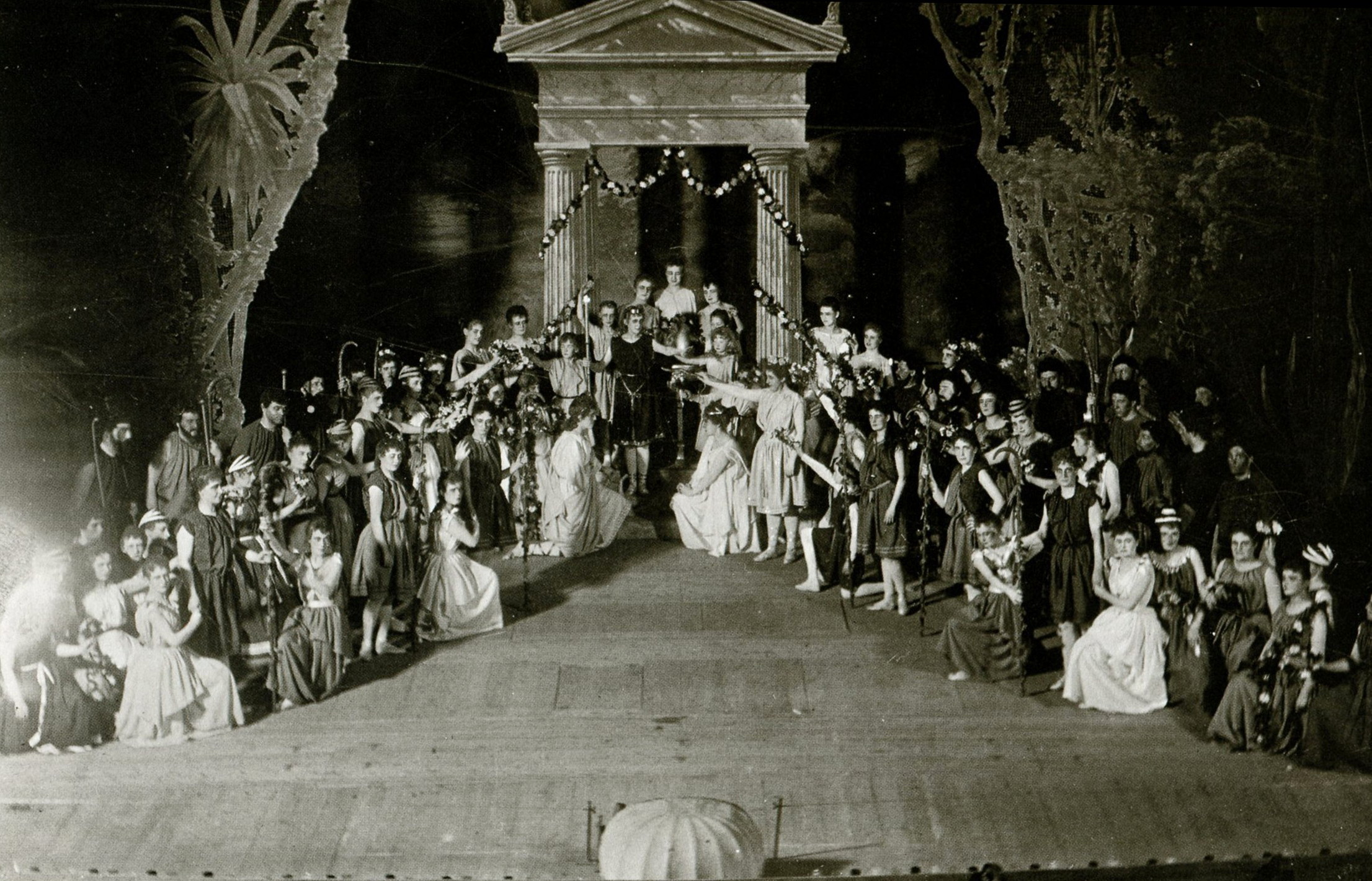
1894 flash photography of scene in Swedish Theatre taken by Wolfenstein

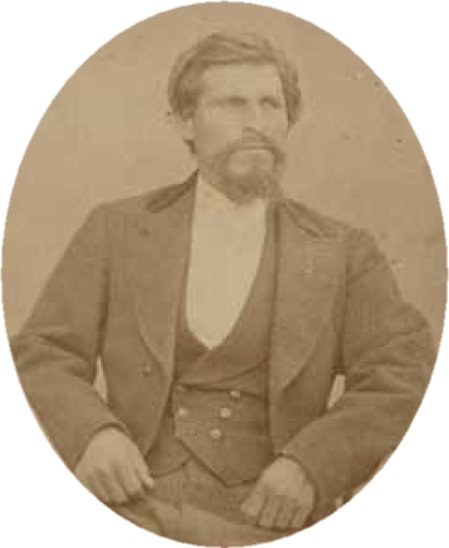
Wolfenstein took this photo of outlaw Tiburcio Vasquez behind the Los Angeles jail on May 18, 1874.
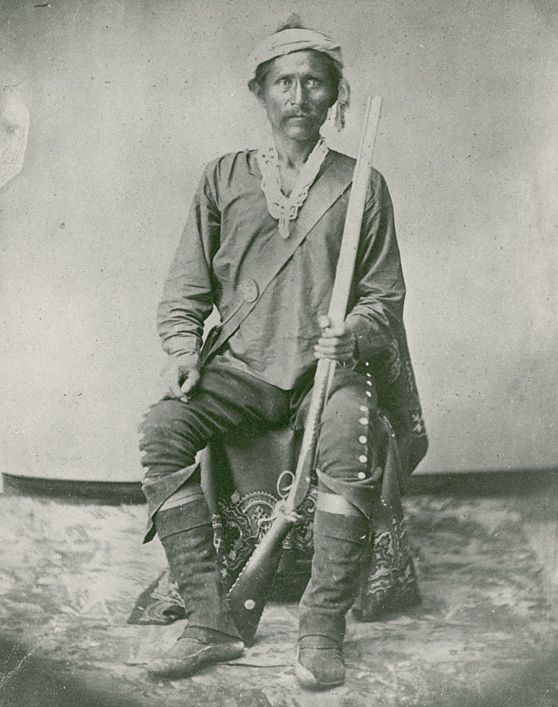
"Man holding rifle", 1868 Navajo chief Barboncito

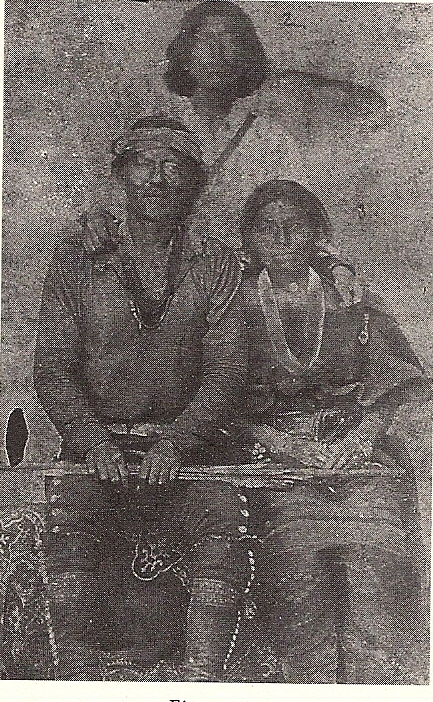
Navajo chief Manuelito with his wife and son, 1868

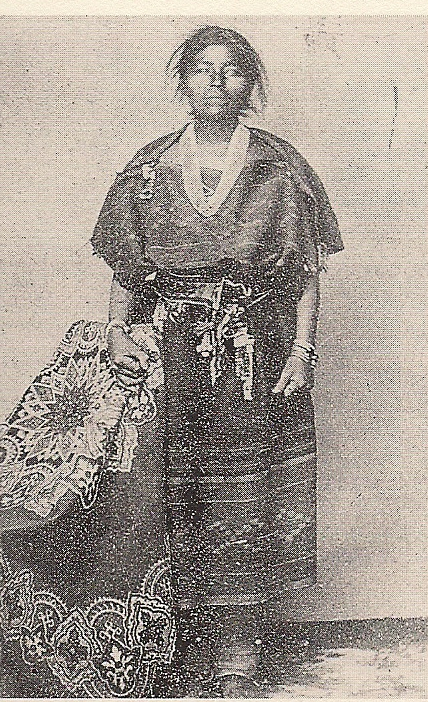
Daughter-in-law of chief Barboncito, "Mica se qui", 1868

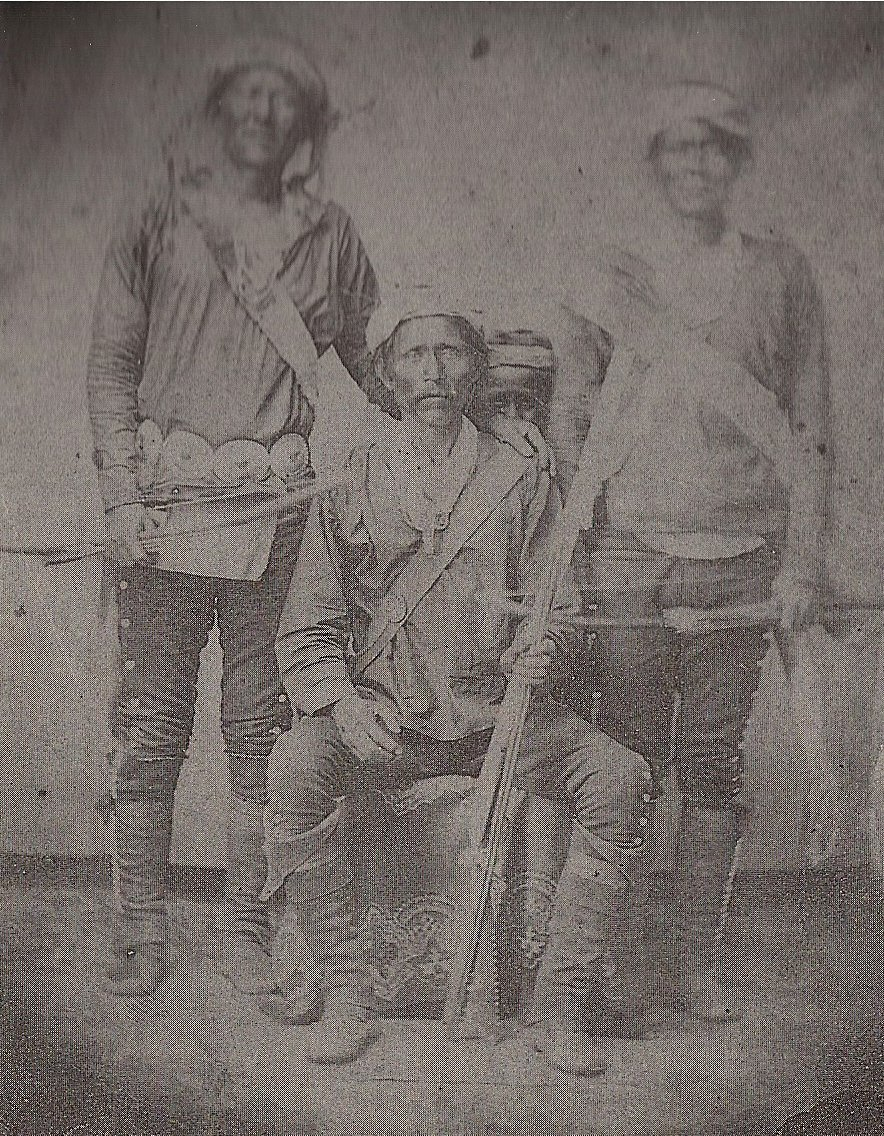
Manuelito, Barboncito, and Navajo boy and man, 1868

== Personal pictures ==
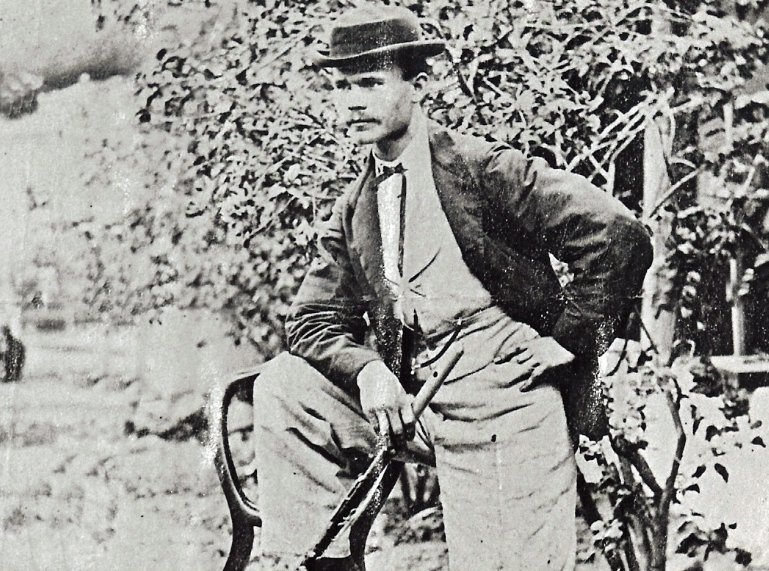
Wolfenstein in Mexico, 1885

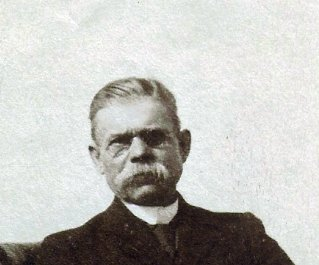
Close-up of Wolfenstein, 1907

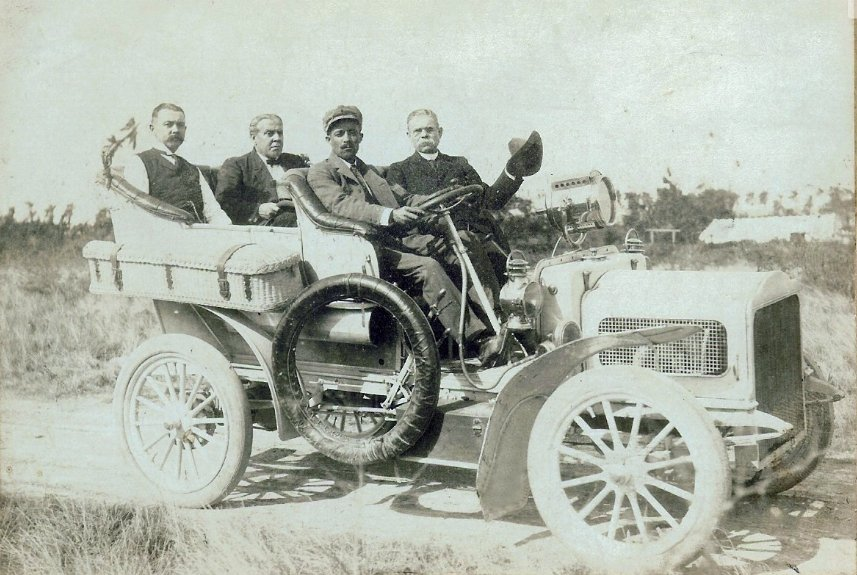
Wolfenstein in Cuba, 1907

== Bibliography ==
- Andrews, Ralph Warren (1964). Picture Gallery Pioneers, 1850 to 1875. Superior Publishing Company.
- Söderberg, Rolf; Rittsel, Pär (1983). Den svenska fotografins historia 1840–1940 The Swedish history of photography. Bonnier fakta. ISBN 978-91-34-50314-4.
- Palmquist, Peter E. (2000). Pioneer Photographers of the Far West: A Biographical Dictionary, 1840–1865. Stanford University Press. ISBN 978-0-8047-3883-5.
