= Marguerite Elizabeth Abbott =

American painter (1870–1953)

- Born: Margaret Elizabeth Abbott; 1870; San Francisco, California, U.S.
- Died: February 17, 1953 (aged 82–83); Los Angeles, California, U.S.
- Resting place: Angelus-Rosedale Cemetery, Los Angeles, California, U.S.
- Occupations: Painter, watercolorist, educator
- Known for: Portrait painter, landscape painter

Margaret "Marguerite" Elizabeth Abbott (1870 – February 17, 1953) was an American painter, and educator. She taught art courses in Los Angeles, California from 1888 until c. 1930.

== Life and career ==
Margaret "Marguerite" Elizabeth Abbott was born on 1870, in San Francisco, California. She studied under Warren Eliphalet Rollins, and Chris Jorgensen in San Francisco.

Abbott was known for her watercolors, and primarily painted portraits and landscapes. In 1888, she had established an art studio in Los Angeles, where she taught portrait painting until 1930. In 1904, her summer art classes were held at the Blanchard Building in Ocean Park in Santa Monica. She never married.

Abbott died on February 17, 1953, in Los Angeles, California. She was posthumously included in the survey exhibition, Southern California Artists, 1890–1940 (1979) at the Laguna Beach Museum of Art (now Laguna Art Museum) in Laguna Beach, California.
