= Angelus-Rosedale Cemetery =

Cemetery in Los Angeles, California

Coordinates: 34.0420°N 118.2978°W

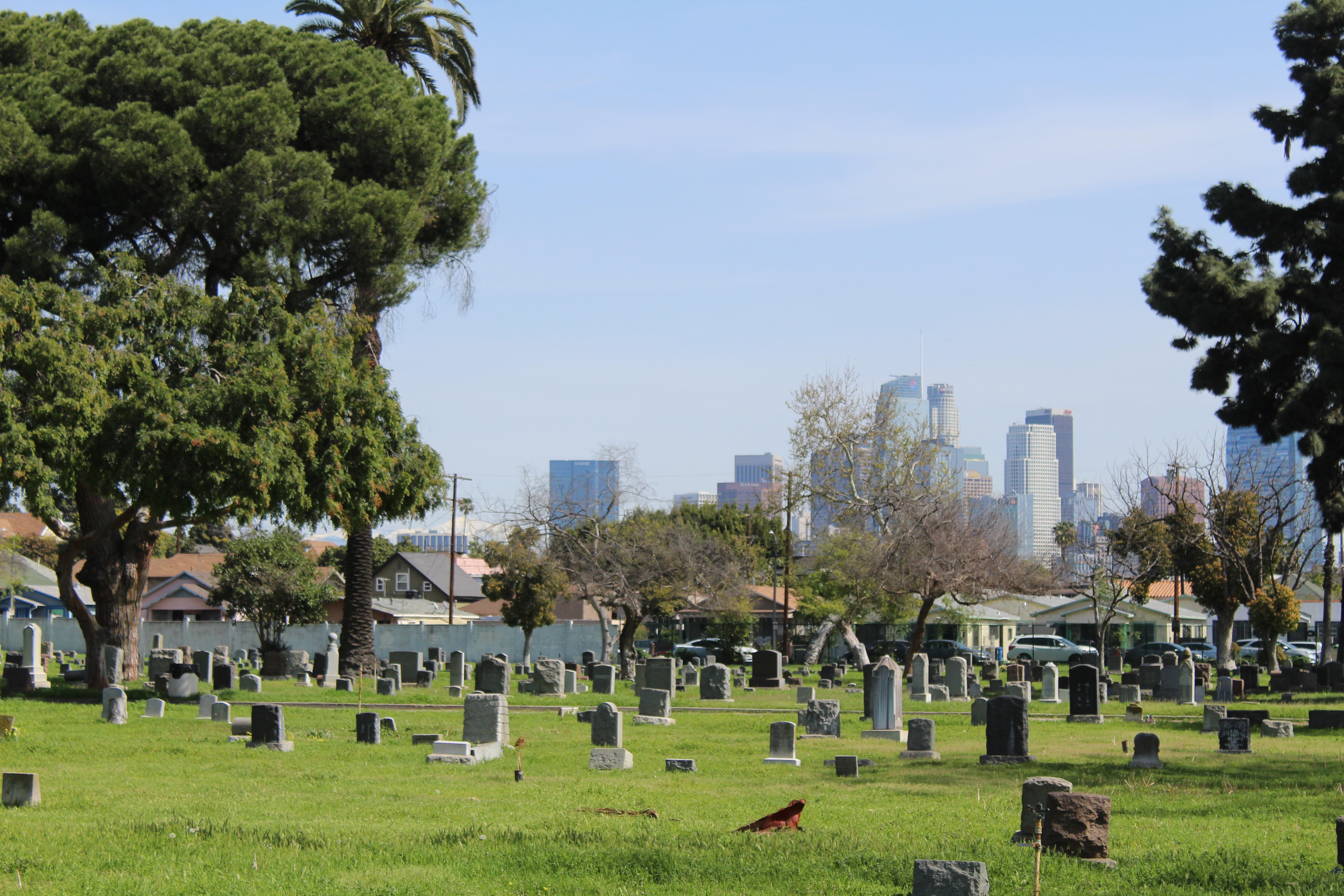
The cemetery in March 2024

Angelus-Rosedale Cemetery is a cemetery, located at 1831 West Washington Boulevard in the West Adams neighborhood of Los Angeles, southwest of Downtown.

== History ==
Located in the West Adams neighborhood of Los Angeles, the cemetery was founded as Rosedale Cemetery in 1884, when Los Angeles had a population of approximately 28,000, on 65 acres (260,000 m^{2}) of land running from Washington to Venice Boulevard (then 16th Street) between Normandie Avenue and Walton and Catalina Streets. It is often used by California politicians, notably former mayors of the City of Los Angeles.The interments include pioneers and members of prominent families in Los Angeles and the state.

Rosedale was the first cemetery in Los Angeles open to all races and creeds, and was the first to adopt the design concept of lawn cemeteries. This is where the grounds are enhanced to surround the graves with beautiful trees, shrubs, flowers, natural scenery and works of monumental art. Among the more traditional structures, headstones and mausoleums, the cemetery also has several pyramid crypts. In 1887, the second crematory in the US was opened at Rosedale Cemetery. It was also the first crematory west of the Rocky Mountains. The initial cremation took place on June 16, when the body of Mrs. Olive A. Bird (c. 1845–1886), wife of prominent physician O.B. Bird, was cremated. By 1913, there had been 2,392 cremations performed at Rosedale. Next to the cemetery at 1605 S. Catalina Street is another cremation facility, the domed, observatory-shaped Chapel of the Pines Crematory.

In 1993, Rosedale was bought by the Angelus Funeral Home on Crenshaw Boulevard and renamed Angelus-Rosedale Cemetery.

== Events ==
On numerous occasions, the West Adams Heritage Association, in conjunction with the Los Angeles Historical Society, has sponsored a "Living History tour" featuring grave site portrayals of historic figures. In 1994, the Los Angeles Times noted that the annual event began 4 years earlier.

== Notable interments ==
Sources not listed here can be found in the articles referenced.

=== A ===
- Marguerite Elizabeth Abbott (1870–1953) painter, and teacher
- George Alexander (1839–1923), politician, 28th Mayor of Los Angeles
- Allen Allensworth (1842–1914), Lt. Colonel of the U.S. Army, founder of Allensworth, California
- Ivie Anderson (1905–1949), jazz singer and actress
- Henry Armstrong (1912–1988), champion boxer

=== B ===
- Edward L. Baker, Jr. (1865–1913), U.S. Army officer, Medal of Honor recipient during Spanish–American War
- Phineas Banning (1830–1885), financier, known as the "Father of the Port of Los Angeles"
- Felice Bauer (1887–1960), twice fiancée (1914 and 1917) of Prague writer Franz Kafka, in 1919 married to Moritz Marasse (1873–1950)
- Thomas Bones (1842–1929), farmer and land developer
- Emmer Bowen (1830–1912), Medal of Honor recipient during the American Civil War
- Tod Browning (1880–1962), film director and screenwriter, known as "The Master of the Macabre"
- David Burbank (1821–1895), dentist, businessman and landholder. Burbank, California, was named for him
- Rose Talbot Bullard (1864–1915), medical doctor and professor
- Betty Burbridge (1895–1987), actress

=== C ===
- Eric Campbell (1879–1917), actor
- Rita Carewe (1909–1955), actress
- Harry Carr (1877–1936), writer, newspaper columnist and editor
- Frank Chance (1877–1924), Hall of Fame baseball player
- Sadie Chandler Cole (1865–1941), singer, civil rights activist
- Florence Cole Talbert (1890–1961), opera singer
- Cleota Collins (1893–1976), singer and voice teacher

=== D ===
- Eric Dolphy (1928–1964), American jazz musician

=== E ===
- Herschel Evans (1909–1939), Afroamerican jazz saxophonist

=== F ===
- Jessie Benton Frémont (1824–1902), writer, wife of Lieutenant Colonel John C. Frémont
- Willie Fung (1896–1945), Chinese film actor

=== G ===
- John Reynolds Gardiner (1944–2006), author
- William Thornton Glassell (1831–1879), Confederate Naval officer and a founder of Orange, California; grand-uncle of George S. Patton
- Louise Glaum (1888–1970), actress
- George E. Goodfellow (1855–1910), physician, medical pioneer, known as the "Gunfighter's Surgeon"
- Lewis Grigsby (1867–1932), real estate investor and philanthropist

=== H ===
- Arthur C. Harper (1866–1948), politician, 36th Mayor of Los Angeles
- Theresa Harris (1909–1985), actress
- Katharine Putnam Hooker (1849–1935), travel writer, socialite
- Sherman Otis Houghton (1828–1914), lawyer, politician

=== K ===
- Harry Kellar (1849–1922), American magician who influenced Harry Houdini

=== L ===
- Fernando Lamas (1915–1982), Argentinian-born actor/director, husband of Esther Williams, was cremated at Rosedale
- Louis Lichtenberger (1835–1892), American politician

=== M ===
- Joseph Maier (1851–1905), brewer, businessman and owner the Maier-Zobelien Brewery in Los Angeles
- John Mansfield (1822–1896), politician, lieutenant governor of California from 1880 to 1883
- Joe Marshall (1876–1931), Major League Baseball player
- Lorenzo Matamales (1896–1991), spanish journalist and writer
- William B. Mayes (1837–1900), Union Army soldier, Medal of Honor recipient
- Owen McAleer (1858–1944), politician, Canadian-born 35th mayor of Los Angeles
- Hattie McDaniel (1895–1952), actress, first African American female to win an Academy Award
- Spencer G. Millard (1856–1895), politician, 20th lieutenant governor of California
- Mable Monohan (1888–1953), murder victim; her death sent Barbara Graham, Emmet Perkins and Jack Santo to the gas chamber
- Gideon C. Moody (1832–1904), American politician, congressman and senator
- Tim Moore (1887–1958), vaudevillian; comic actor, stage, screen and television. Known for his role as The Kingfish of Amos 'n' Andy fame.

=== N ===
- Remi Nadeau (1819–1887), French Canadian pioneer who arrived in Los Angeles in 1861
- Marshall Neilan (1891–1958), director, actor, motion picture pioneer
- John G. Nichols (1813–1898), 3rd and 10th Mayor of Los Angeles

=== O ===
- Henry Z. Osborne (1848–1923), politician, served in the House of Representatives from California

=== P ===
- John Henry Patterson (1867–1947), Anglo-Irish soldier, hunter, author and Zionist, best known for his book The Man-Eaters of Tsavo (1907); exhumed and re-interred in Avihayil, Israel, in 2014.
- William Anthony Polkinghorn (1851–1906), noted real estate developer (Venice, Santa Monica), civic leader (Los Angeles, Leadville, CO)
- Louise Peete (1880–1947), notorious multiple murderer, executed in the gas chamber at San Quentin
- Stanley Price (1892–1955), actor

=== R ===
- Frank Rader (1848–1897), politician, 31st Mayor of Los Angeles
- Andy Razaf (1895–1973), lyricist, composer, wrote "Ain't Misbehavin'" and "Honeysuckle Rose"
- William A. Rennie (1854–1919) judge, jurist and journalist, founded the Venice Vanguard
- Frederick H. Rindge (1857–1905), American businessman, philanthropist and writer
- Anthony A. C. Rogers (1821–1899), politician, served in the House of Representatives from Arkansas
- Maria Rasputin (1898–1977), daughter of Russia's notorious "mad monk", Grigori Rasputin

=== S ===
- Monroe Salisbury (1876–1935), actor
- Caroline Severance (1820–1914), social reformer, suffragette
- Herman Silver (1831–1913), superintendent of the United States Mint in Colorado, a collector of internal revenue, a railroad official and Los Angeles City Council member
- Everett Sloane (1909–1965), actor, was in Orson Welles' Mercury Theatre, played Mr. Bernstein in Citizen Kane
- Lucy Stanton Day Sessions (1831 – 1910) was an American abolitionist and feminist figure, and the first African-American woman to complete a four-year course of a study at a college or university.
- Robert Stewart Sparks (1871–1932), Los Angeles City Council member
- Hannah Judkins Starbird (1832–1922), American Civil War nurse
- William Stephens (1859–1944), 24th California Governor

=== T ===
- Art Tatum (1909–1956), jazz pianist (has cenotaph; originally interred here, he was removed to Forest Lawn Cemetery, Glendale)
- William I. Traeger (1880–1935), lawman, politician, football coach, sheriff of Los Angeles County from 1921 to 1932, served term in the House of Representatives from California
- Wayland Trask, Jr. (1887–1918), American stage and silent film comedian
- John Q. Tufts (1840–1908), politician, served in the House of Representatives from Iowa

=== W ===
- Ernestine Wade (1906–1983), actress, played Sapphire Stevens on radio and TV's Amos 'n' Andy
- Olin Wellborn (1843–1921), politician, served in House of Representatives from Texas
- Franz Werfel (1890–1945), Austrian writer (whose body was transferred in 1975 to the Zentralfriedhof, Vienna)
- Ernest Whitman (1893–1954), actor, played the Carpetbagger's friend in Gone with the Wind
- Robert M. Widney (1838–1929), American lawyer, judge, a founder of the University of Southern California
- Harvey H. Wilcox (1832–1891), owned a ranch northwest of Los Angeles, which his wife, Daeida, named Hollywood. Originally interred in Rosedale, alongside his mother, Azubah (Mark) Wilcox (c. 1804–1888); he was removed to Hollywood Cemetery in 1922
- Dooley Wilson (1886–1953), actor, musician, played Sam in Casablanca
- Valentin Wolfenstein (1845–1909), Swedish-American photographer
- Anna May Wong (1905–1961), actress, the first Chinese American movie star
- Frederic T. Woodman (1872–1949), politician, 41st mayor of Los Angeles
