= Photonic curing =

Thermal processing of thin film using pulsed light

Photonic curing of a printed nanosilver trace on PET.

Photonic curing is the high-temperature thermal processing of a thin film using pulsed light from a flashlamp. When this transient processing is done on a low-temperature substrate such as plastic or paper, it is possible to attain a significantly higher temperature than the substrate can ordinarily withstand under an equilibrium heating source such as an oven. Since the rate of most thermal curing processes (drying, sintering, reacting, annealing, etc.) generally increase exponentially with temperature (i.e. they obey the Arrhenius equation), this process allows materials to be cured much more rapidly than with an oven.

It has become a transformative process used in the manufacture of printed electronics as it allows inexpensive and flexible substrates to be substituted for traditional glass or ceramic substrates. Additionally, the higher temperature processing afforded by photonic curing reduces the processing time exponentially, often from minutes down to milliseconds, which increases throughput all while maintaining a small machine footprint.

== Heat Transfer Dynamics ==
Photonic curing primarily relies on radiative heat transfer from the lamp to the object of interest during the time that the flashlamp is on, usually between 100 μs and 100 ms. After radiative heat impinges on this object, thermal conduction through the object and convective loss to the atmosphere in contact with the material will occur until the object nears thermal equilibrium. Because of the intensity and short duration of the flashlamp pulse, extreme thermal gradients can occur in the object of interest. Those extreme gradients can be useful in exposing only certain parts of an object to high temperatures.

For most applications of photonic curing, designers consider a layered stack of materials. The goal of a curing profile design is to reach sufficient temperature to cause sintering and metalization of a top layer or print, while avoiding exceeding the glass transition temperature, melting temperature, or flash point of the layers beneath. The transient thermal process of dissipating the heat delivered by the flashlamp depends, again, on the convective thermal losses from the top and bottom layers of the material of interest, and on the thickness of each layer. For thick layers or layers with low thermal conductivity, heat can be dissipated before the temperature of lower layers in the stack can exceed a glass transition or melting temperature. This is the key feature of photonic curing that allows for the curing of metals and conductive inks and paste on low temperature materials.

== Uses ==
Photonic curing is used as a thermal processing technique in the manufacturing of printed electronics as it allows the substitution of glass or ceramic substrate materials with inexpensive and flexible substrate materials such as polymers or paper. The effect can be demonstrated with an ordinary camera flash. Industrial photonic curing systems are typically water cooled and have controls and features similar to industrial lasers. The pulse rate can be fast enough to allow curing on the fly at speeds beyond 100 m/min making it suitable as a curing process for roll-to-roll processing. Material processing rates can exceed 1 m^{2}/s.

The maturing complexity of modern printed electronics for customer applications demands high throughput manufacturing and improved device function. The functionality of the printed electronics is critically important as customers demand more out of each device. Multiple layers are designed into each device, requiring ever more versatile processing techniques. Photonic curing is uniquely suited to complement the processing needs in the manufacture of modern printed electronics by providing a fast, reliable and transformative processing step. Photonic curing enables a lower thermal processing budget with current materials, and it can provide a path to incorporate more advanced materials and functionality into future printed electronics.

== Development ==
Photonic curing is similar to Pulse Thermal Processing, developed at Oak Ridge National Laboratory, in which a plasma arc lamp is used. In the case of photonic curing, the radiant power is higher and the pulse length is shorter. The total radiant exposure per pulse is less with photonic curing, but the pulse rate is much faster.
