= YLF =

YLF may refer to:

- Youth Leader Fund, an international educational initiative by United Nations Office for Disarmament Affairs
- Yttrium lithium fluoride, a birefringent crystal
- Neodymium-doped yttrium lithium fluoride, a lasing medium for arc lamp-pumped and diode-pumped solid-state lasers
- Pr:YLF laser, a solid state laser
