= Yttrium aluminium garnet =

Synthetic crystalline material

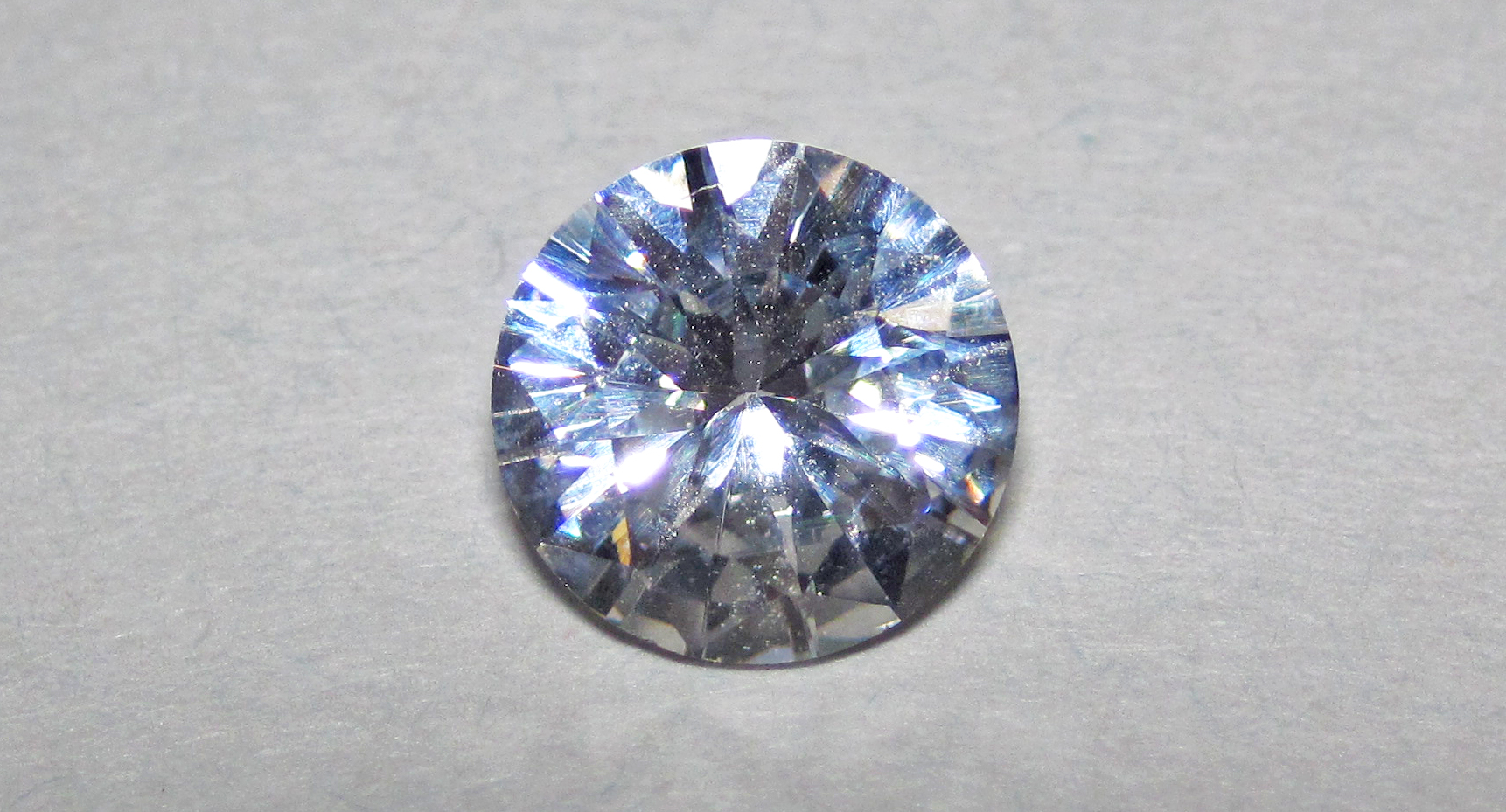

General
- Category: synthetic mineral
- Formula: Y_{3}Al_{5}O_{12}
- Crystal system: Cubic

Identification
- Color: Usually colorless, but may be pink, red, orange, yellow, green, blue, purple
- Cleavage: None
- Fracture: Conchoidal to uneven
- Mohs scale hardness: 8.5
- Luster: Vitreous to subadamantine
- Specific gravity: 4.5–4.6
- Polish luster: Vitreous to subadamantine
- Optical properties: Single refractive
- Refractive index: 1.833±0.010
- Birefringence: None
- Pleochroism: None
- Dispersion: 0.028
- Ultraviolet fluorescence: Colorless stones - inert to moderate orange in long wave, inert to weak orange in short wave; blue and pink stones - inert; yellow-green stones - very strong yellow in long and short wave also phosphoresces; green stones - strong red in long wave, weak red in short wave

Yttrium aluminium garnet (YAG, Y_{3}Al_{5}O_{12}) is a synthetic crystalline material of the garnet group. It is a cubic yttrium aluminium oxide phase, with other examples being YAlO_{3} (YAP) in a hexagonal or an orthorhombic, perovskite-like form, and the monoclinic Y_{4}Al_{2}O_{9} (YAM).

Due to its broad optical transparency, low internal stress, high hardness, chemical and heat resistance, YAG is used for a variety of optics. Its lack of birefringence (unlike sapphire) makes it an interesting material for high-energy/high-power laser systems. Laser damage levels of YAG ranged from 1.1 to 2.2 kJ/cm^{2} (1064 nm, 10 ns).

YAG, like garnet and sapphire, has no uses as a laser medium when pure. However, after being doped with an appropriate ion, YAG is commonly used as a host material in various solid-state lasers. Rare earth elements such as neodymium and erbium can be doped into YAG as active laser ions, yielding Nd:YAG and Er:YAG lasers, respectively. Cerium-doped YAG (Ce:YAG) is used as a phosphor in cathode-ray tubes and white light-emitting diodes, and as a scintillator. It is often produced with the Czochralski method. YAG is produced with this process in an iridium crucible at 2100 °C under oxidizing conditions with mixed oxides as the starting charge.

== Crystal structure ==
Crystal structure of YAG (Y_{3}Al_{5}O_{12}) viewed along [111]. Dark-blue AlO_{6} octahedra (Al1), light-blue AlO_{4} tetrahedra (Al2), and orange spheres (Y atoms) are shown. The unit cell is outlined in grey. Scale bar: 5.0 Å.

== Gemstone YAG ==
YAG for a period was used in jewelry as a diamond and other gemstone simulant. Colored variants and their doping elements include: green (chromium), blue (cobalt), red (manganese), yellow (titanium), blue/pink/purple (neodymium, depending on light source), pink, and orange. As faceted gems they are valued (as synthetics) for their clarity, durability, high refractive index and dispersion, and occasionally properties like simulating alexandrite's color-changing property. The critical angle of YAG is 33 degrees. YAG cuts like natural garnet, with polishing being performed with alumina or diamond (50,000 or 100,000 grit) on common polishing laps. YAG has low heat sensitivity.

As a synthetic gemstone YAG has numerous varietal and trade names, as well as a number of misnomers. Synonymous names include: alexite, amamite, circolite, christmas garnet (specifically Cr:YAG), dia-bud, diamite, diamogem, diamonair, diamone, diamonique, diamonite, diamonte, di'yag, geminair, gemonair, kimberly, Linde simulated diamond, nier-gem, regalair, replique, somerset, triamond, YAlG, and yttrium garnet. Production for the gem trade decreased after the introduction of synthetic cubic zirconia; as of 1995 there was little production. Some demand exists as synthetic garnet, and for designs where the very high refractive index of cubic zirconia is not desirable.

== Technical-use varieties ==
=== Nd:YAG ===
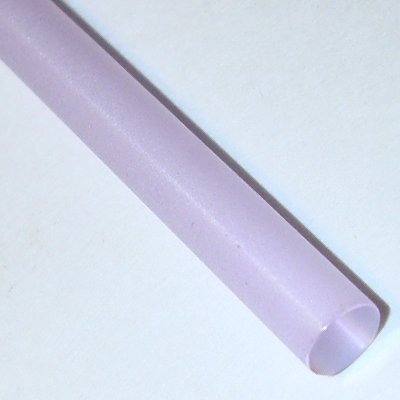
Nd:YAG laser rod 0.5 cm in diameter.

Neodymium-doped YAG (Nd:YAG) was developed in the early 1960s, and the first working Nd:YAG laser was invented in 1964. Neodymium-YAG is the most widely used active laser medium in solid-state lasers, being used for everything from low-power continuous-wave lasers to high-power Q-switched (pulsed) lasers with power levels measured in the kilowatts. The thermal conductivity of Nd:YAG is higher and its fluorescence lifetime is about twice as long as that of Nd:YVO_{4} crystals, however it is not as efficient and is less stable, requiring more precisely controlled temperatures. The best absorption band of Nd:YAG for pumping the laser is centered at 807.5 nm, and is 1 nm wide.

Most Nd:YAG lasers produce infrared light at a wavelength of 1064 nm. Light at this wavelength is rather dangerous to vision, since it can be focused by the eye's lens onto the retina, but the light is invisible and does not trigger the blink reflex. Nd:YAG lasers can also be used with frequency doubling or frequency tripling crystals, to produce green light with a wavelength of 532 nm or ultraviolet light at 355 nm, respectively.

The dopant concentration in commonly used Nd:YAG crystals usually varies between 0.5 and 1.4 molar percent. Higher dopant concentration is used for pulsed lasers; lower concentration is suitable for continuous-wave lasers. Nd:YAG is pinkish-purple, with lighter-doped rods being less intensely colored than heavier-doped ones. Since its absorption spectrum is narrow, the hue depends on the light under which it is observed.

=== Nd:Cr:YAG ===
YAG doped with neodymium and chromium (Nd:Cr:YAG or Nd/Cr:YAG) has absorption characteristics which are superior to Nd:YAG. This is because energy is absorbed by the broad absorption bands of the Cr^{3+} dopant and then transferred to Nd^{3+} by dipole-dipole interactions. This material has been suggested for use in solar-pumped lasers, which could form part of a solar power satellite system.

=== Er:YAG ===
Erbium-doped YAG (Er:YAG) is an active laser medium lasing at 2940 nm. Its absorption bands suitable for pumping are wide and located between 600 and 800 nm, allowing for efficient flashlamp pumping. The dopant concentration used is high: about 50% of the yttrium atoms are replaced. The Er:YAG laser wavelength couples well into water and body fluids, making this laser especially useful for medicine and dentistry uses; it is used for treatment of tooth enamel and in cosmetic surgery. Er:YAG is used for noninvasive monitoring of blood sugar. The mechanical properties of Er:YAG are essentially the same as Nd:YAG. Er:YAG operates at wavelengths where the threshold for eye damage is relatively high (since the light is absorbed before striking the retina), works well at room temperature, and has high slope efficiency. Er:YAG is pink.

=== Yb:YAG ===
Ytterbium-doped YAG (Yb:YAG) is an active laser medium lasing at 1030 nm, with a broad, 18 nm wide absorption band at 940 nm. It is one of the most useful media for high-power diode-pumped solid state lasers. The dopant levels used range between 0.2% and 30% of replaced yttrium atoms. Yb:YAG has very low fractional heating, very high slope efficiency, and no excited-state absorption or up-conversion, high mechanical strength and high thermal conductivity. Yb:YAG can be pumped by reliable InGaAs laser diodes at 940 or 970 nm.

Yb:YAG is a good substitute for 1064 nm Nd:YAG in high-power applications, and its frequency-doubled 515 nm version can replace the 514 nm argon lasers.

=== Nd:Ce:YAG ===
Neodymium-cerium double-doped YAG (Nd:Ce:YAG, or Nd,Ce:YAG) is an active laser medium material very similar to Nd:YAG. The added cerium atoms strongly absorb in the ultraviolet region and transfer their energy to the neodymium atoms, increasing the pumping efficiency; the result is lower thermal distortion and higher power output than Nd:YAG at the same pumping level. The lasing wavelength, 1064 nm, is the same as for Nd:YAG. The material has a good resistance to damage caused by UV from the pump source, and low lasing threshold. Usually 1.1–1.4% of Y atoms are replaced with Nd, and 0.05–0.1% with Ce.

=== Ho:Cr:Tm:YAG ===
Holmium-chromium-thulium triple-doped YAG (Ho:Cr:Tm:YAG, or Ho,Cr,Tm:YAG) is an active laser medium material with high efficiency. It lases at 2080 nm and can be pumped by a flashlamp or a laser diode. It is widely used in military, medicine, and meteorology. It works well at room temperature, has high slope efficiency, and operates at a wavelength where the threshold for eye damage is relatively high. When pumped by a diode, the 785 nm band for Tm^{3+} ion can be used. Other major pump bands are located between 400 and 800 nm. The dopant levels used are 0.35 atom.% Ho, 5.8 atom.% Tm, and 1.5 at.% Cr. The rods have green color, imparted by chromium(III).

=== Tm:YAG ===
Thulium-doped YAG (Tm:YAG) is an active laser medium that operates between 1930 and 2040 nm. It is suitable for diode pumping. A dual-mode Tm:YAG laser emits two frequencies separated by 1 GHz.

=== Cr^{4+}:YAG ===
Chromium (IV)-doped YAG (Cr:YAG) provides a large absorption cross section in the 0.9-1.2 micrometer spectral region, which makes it an attractive choice as a passive Q-switch for Nd-doped lasers. The resulting devices are solid-state, compact and low-cost. Cr:YAG has high damage threshold, good thermal conductivity, good chemical stability, resists ultraviolet radiation, and is easily machinable. It is replacing more traditional Q-switching materials like lithium fluoride and organic dyes. The dopant levels used range between 0.5 and 3 percent (molar). Cr:YAG can be used for passive Q-switching of lasers that operate at wavelengths between 1000 and 1200 nm, such as those based on Nd:YAG, Nd:YLF, Nd:YVO_{4}, and Yb:YAG.

Cr:YAG can be also used as a laser gain medium itself, producing tunable lasers with outputs adjustable between 1350 and 1550 nm. The Cr:YAG laser can generate ultrashort pulses (in the femtoseconds range) when it is pumped at 1064 nm by a Nd:YAG laser.

Cr:YAG has been demonstrated in an application of non-linear optics as a self-pumped phase-conjugate mirror in a Nd:YAG "loop resonator". Such a mirror provides compensation of both phase and polarization aberrations induced into the loop resonator.

=== Dy:YAG ===
Dysprosium-doped YAG (Dy:YAG) is a temperature-sensitive phosphor used in temperature measurements. The phosphor is excited by a laser pulse and its temperature-dependent fluorescence is observed. Dy:YAG is sensitive in ranges of 300–1700 K. The phosphor can be applied directly to the measured surface, or to an end of an optical fiber. It has also been studied as a single-phase white emitting phosphor in phosphor-converted white light-emitting diodes.

=== Sm:YAG ===
Samarium-doped YAG (Sm:YAG) is a temperature-sensitive phosphor similar to Dy:YAG.

=== Tb:YAG ===
Terbium-doped YAG (Tb:YAG) is a phosphor used in cathode-ray tubes. It emits at yellow-green color, at 544 nm.

=== Ce:YAG ===
Cerium(III)-doped YAG (Ce:YAG or YAG:Ce) is a phosphor, or a scintillator when in pure single-crystal form, with a wide range of uses. It emits yellow light when subjected to blue or ultraviolet light or to x-rays. It is used in white light-emitting diodes as a coating on a high-brightness blue InGaN diode, converting part of the blue light into yellow, which together then appear as white. Such an arrangement gives less than ideal color rendering. The output brightness decreases with increasing temperature, further altering device color output.

Ce:YAG is also used in some mercury-vapor lamps as one of the phosphors, often together with Eu:Y(P,V)O_{4} (yttrium phosphate-vanadate). It is also used as a phosphor in cathode-ray tubes, where it emits green (530 nm) to yellow-green (550 nm) light. When excited by electrons, it has virtually no afterglow (70 ns decay time). It is suitable for use in photomultipliers.

Ce:YAG is used in PET scanners, high-energy gamma radiation and charged particle detectors, and high-resolution imaging screens for gamma, x-rays, beta radiation and ultraviolet radiation.

Ce:YAG can be further doped with gadolinium.

== See also ==
- Er:YAG laser
- Micro-pulling-down
- Nd:YAG laser
- Yttrium iron garnet
