= Pr:YLF laser =

Type of solid-state laser

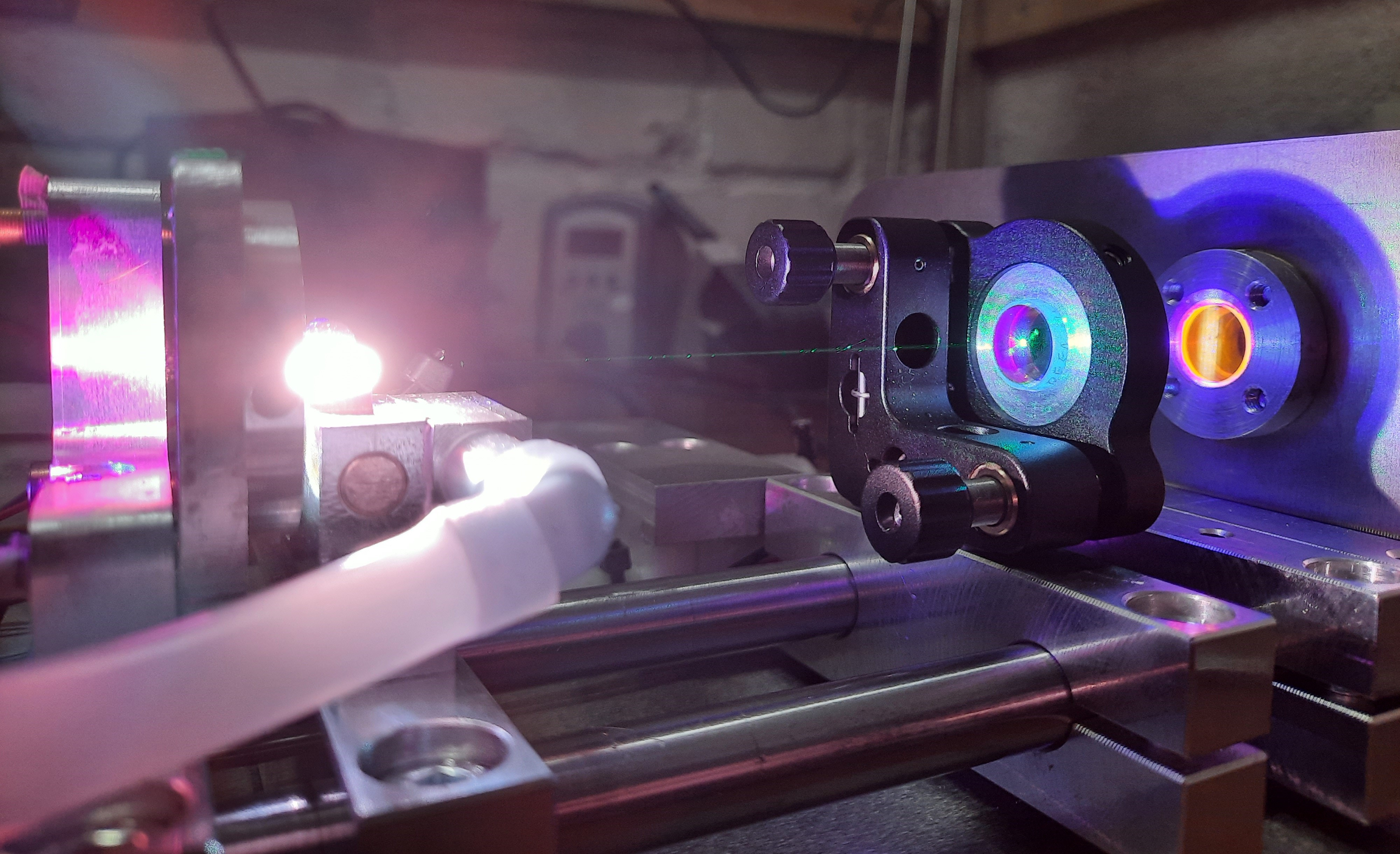
Pr:YLF laser lasing at 523 nm. The Pr:YLF crystal fluoresces white. The intracavity beam can be seen through rayleigh scattering because of its high intensity.

A Pr:YLF laser (or Pr^{3+}:LiYF_{4} laser) is a solid state laser that uses a praseodymium doped yttrium-lithium-fluoride crystal as its gain medium. The first Pr:YLF laser was built in 1977 and emitted pulses at 479 nm. Pr:YLF lasers can emit in many different wavelengths in the visible spectrum of light, making them potentially interesting for RGB applications and materials processing. Notable emission wavelengths are 479 nm, 523 nm, 607 nm and 640 nm.

== Technology ==
Several notable transitions of the praseodymium ion within a YLF host matrix.

Pr:YLF lasers are optically pumped using flashlamps, pulsed dye lasers or diode lasers. The strongest emission line of Pr:YLF is 640 nm, which stems from the $^3P_0 \rightarrow \ ^{3}F_2$ transition of the Pr^{3+}- ion. However, by suppressing this line (and other lines stronger than the desired one), other transitions can be used for obtaining different wavelengths. This can be done using dichroic mirrors. Pr:YLF lasers are pumped by using the transitions from $^3H_4$ to $^3P_2$, $^3P_1$ or $^3P_0$ (corresponding wavelengths: 444 nm, 469 nm, 479 nm). The Pr^{3+}- ion then undergoes a quick, radiationless transition (fast relaxation), followed by the light-emitting transition. Finally, the ground level ($^3H_4$) is reached via another radiationless transfer, making the Pr:YLF laser a 4-level system. Pr:YLF supports lasing at the following wavelengths: 479 nm, 523 nm, 546 nm, 607 nm, 640 nm, 698 nm, 721 nm, 907 nm and 915 nm.

The $^3H_4 \rightarrow \ ^3P_2$ transition is of special interest, since its wavelength (444 nm) can be covered by InGaN laser diodes, which are commercially available at high output powers. Because the absorption peak at 444 nm only has a bandwidth of a few nanometers, pumpdiodes have to be selected and stabilized for efficient laser action. Diode pumped solid state (DPSS) lasers using these diodes have reached multiple watts of output powers in continuous wave operation. Typical DPSS setups using Pr:YLF crystals consist of a hemispheric resonator in which the crystal is pumped longitudinally by the pump diode. Depending on the resonator length, this resonator type can tolerate slight misalignments of the mirrors and retains stability even if the crystal shows thermal lensing effects. The plane mirror of the resonator can be replaced by coating one face of the crystal, making the setup very compact.

Although several other rare-earth dopants such as Sm^{3+}, Tb^{3+}, Dy^{3+}, Ho^{3+} and Er^{3+} offer transitions in the visible spectrum, the most efficient emission in this region is achieved by Pr:YLF lasers

Pr:YLF lasers can be operated in continuous wave (cw) or pulsed mode. Q-Switched and frequency-doubled Pr:YLF lasers have also been reported.

== Applications ==
Pr:YLF lasers, especially in combination with high power InGaN laser diodes, are of high scientific interestic because of their emission lines in the visible spectrum of light and potentially very compact laser setups. Besides biomedical applications such as fluorescence microscopy or cytometry, Pr:YLF lasers also are very attractive for the use in powerful RGB light sources.

Furthermore, compact and efficient continuous wave (deep) UV lasers can be made by frequency doubling the output of Pr:YLF lasers. Nanosecond UV pulses can be obtained by Q-switching frequency doubled Pr:YLF lasers. Pulsed and/or continuous wave UV lasers can be used for very precise materials processing, photoluminescence analysis, lithography for semiconductor manufacturing and inspection, UV Raman spectroscopy, eye surgery, etc.

Applications also include precise and efficient materials processing of some non-ferrous metals like copper or gold.
