= Yttrium lithium fluoride =

Identifiers
CAS Number	39345-89-6
3D model (JSmol)	Interactive image
PubChem CID	22645984
CompTox Dashboard (EPA)	DTXSID90627285
- InChI: InChI=1S/4FH.Li.Y/h4*1H;;/q;;;;+1;+3/p-4 Key: HIQSCMNRKRMPJT-UHFFFAOYSA-J
- SMILES: [Li+].[F-].[F-].[F-].[F-].[Y+3]

Properties
Chemical formula	F_{4}LiY
Molar mass	171.84 g·mol^{−1}

Related compounds
Other cations	Lithium holmium fluoride
- Except where otherwise noted, data are given for materials in their standard state (at 25 °C [77 °F], 100 kPa). Infobox references

Yttrium lithium fluoride (LiYF_{4}, sometimes abbreviated YLF) is a yellowish transparent birefringent crystal, typically doped with neodymium or praseodymium and used as a gain medium in solid-state lasers. Yttrium is the substitutional element in LiYF_{4.} The hardness of YLF is significantly lower than other commons crystalline laser media, i.e. yttrium aluminium garnet.

== See also ==
- Neodymium-doped yttrium lithium fluoride
