= Takashi Yabe =

- Known for: CIP method and Magnesium injection cycle
- Scientific career
- Institutions: Tokyo Institute of Technology, Osaka University

Takashi Yabe (矢部 孝, Yabe Takashi) is a professor at the Department of Mechanical Sciences and Engineering, Tokyo Institute of Technology (Tokyo Tech.).

== Career ==
Takashi Yabe graduated from Tokyo Institute of Technology in 1973 and immediately became a research associate. After getting doctor degree of engineering, he moved to Osaka University as an associate professor and then returned to Tokyo Tech. as a professor in 1995.

His specialties are theoretical and experimental studies of interactions between laser light and substances. He has established a venture business called Electra to realize the magnesium-based society using "solar-pumped laser", and currently serves as its CEO.

Another specialty of Dr. Yabe is computational fluid dynamics. He has developed the "CIP Method" that can realistically replicate phenomena that are difficult to simulate such as collisions of objects and waves at the liquid–gas interface. Because of this work, he was invited to give a bicentenary memorial lecture at the Royal Institution of Great Britain in 1999 in addition to the keynote lectures in many international conferences and awarded by several societies.

He is currently General Council of APACM, Executive Council of IACM and Honorary Fellow of International Society for Computational Fluid Dynamics.

The TIME magazine chose him as an "Innovator" of "Heroes of the Environment 2009" in September 2009.
