= Nuclear pumped laser =

Laser pumped with the energy of fission fragments

A nuclear pumped laser is laser pumped with the energy of fission fragments. The lasing medium is enclosed in a tube lined with uranium-235 and subjected to high neutron flux in a nuclear reactor core. The fission fragments of the uranium create excited plasma with inverse population of energy levels, which then lases. Other methods, e.g. the He-Ar laser, can use the He(n,p)H reaction, the transmutation of helium-3 in a neutron flux, as the energy source, or employing the energy of the alpha particles.

This technology may achieve high excitation rates with small laser volumes.

Example lasing media include carbon dioxide, ^{3}helium-argon, ^{3}helium-krypton, and ^{3}helium-xenon.

At least three uses for bomb pumped lasers have been proposed: space propulsion, manufacturing, and in warfare.

== Development ==
Research in nuclear pumped lasers started in the early 1970s when researchers were unable to produce a laser with a wavelength shorter than 110 nm with the end goal of creating an x-ray laser. When laser wavelengths become that short the laser requires a huge amount of energy which must also be delivered in an extremely short period of time. In 1975 it was estimated, by George Chapline and Lowell Wood from the Lawrence Livermore National Laboratory, that “pumping a 10-keV (0.12-nm) laser would require around a watt per atom” in a pulse that was “10^{−15} seconds x the square of the wavelength in angstroms.” As this problem was unsolvable with the materials at hand and a laser oscillator was not working, research moved to creating pumps that used excited plasma. Early attempts used high-powered lasers to excite the plasma to create an even more highly powered laser. Results using this method were unsatisfying, and fell short of the goal. Livermore scientists first suggested using a nuclear reaction as a power source in 1975. By 1980 Livermore considered both nuclear bombs and nuclear reactors as viable energy sources for an x-ray laser. On November 14, 1980, the first successful test of the bomb-powered x-ray laser was conducted. The use of a bomb was initially supported over that of the reactor driven laser because it delivered a more intense beam. Livermore's research was almost entirely devoted to missile defense using x-ray lasers. The idea was to mount a system of nuclear bombs in space where these bombs would each power approximately 50 lasers. Upon detonation these lasers would fire and theoretically destroy several dozen incoming nuclear missiles at once. Opponents of this plan found many faults in such an approach and questioned aspects such as the power, range, accuracy, politics, and cost of such deployments. In 1985 a test titled ‘Goldstone’ revealed the delivered power to be less than believed. Efforts to focus the laser also failed.

Fusion lasers (reactor driven lasers) started testing after the bomb-driven lasers proved successful. While prohibitively expensive (estimated at 30,000 dollars per test), research was easier in that tests could be performed several times a day and the equipment could be reused. In 1984, a test achieved wavelengths of less than 21 nm, the closest to an official x-ray laser yet. (There are many definitions for an x-ray laser, some of which require a wavelength of less than 10 nm). The Livermore method was to remove the outer electrons in heavy atoms to create a “neon-like” substance. When presented at an American Physical Society meeting, the success of the test was shared by an experiment from Princeton University which was better in size, cost, measured wavelength, and amplification than Livermore's test. Research has continued in the field of nuclear pumped lasers and it remains on the cutting edge of the field.

== Uses ==
Laser propulsion is an alternative method of propulsion ideal for launching objects into orbit, as this method requires less fuel, meaning less mass must be launched. A nuclear pumped laser is ideal for this operation. A launch using laser propulsion requires high intensity, short pulses, good quality^{[Define?]}, and a high power output. A nuclear pumped laser would theoretically be capable of meeting these requirements.

The characteristics of the nuclear pumped laser make it ideal for applications in deep-cut welding, cutting thick materials, the heat treating of metals, vapor deposition of ceramics, and the production of sub-micron sized particles.

Titled Project Excalibur, the program was a part of President Reagan's Strategic Defense Initiative. Livermore Laboratories conceived of the initial idea and Edward Teller developed and presented the idea to the president. Permission was granted to pursue the project though it has been reported Reagan was reluctant to incorporate nuclear devices in the nation's plan against nuclear devices. While initial tests were promising, the results never reached acceptable levels. Later, lead scientists were accused of falsifying the reports. Project Excalibur was cancelled several years later.
