= Neodymium-doped yttrium lithium fluoride =

Chemical used in lasers

Neodymium-doped yttrium lithium fluoride (Nd:YLF) is a lasing medium for arc lamp-pumped and diode-pumped solid-state lasers. The YLF crystal (LiYF_{4}) is naturally birefringent, and commonly used laser transitions occur at 1047 nm and 1053 nm. It most often appears as a pale pinkish transparent crystal, not unlike rose quartz.

It is used in Q-switched systems in part due to its relatively long fluorescence lifetime. As with Nd:YAG lasers, harmonic generation is frequently employed with Q-switched Nd:YLF to produce shorter wavelengths. A common application of frequency-doubled Nd:YLF pulses is to pump ultrafast Ti:Sapphire chirped-pulse amplifiers.

Neodymium-doped YLF can provide higher pulse energies than Nd:YAG for repetition rates of a few kHz or less. Compared to Nd:YAG, the Nd:YLF crystal is very brittle and fractures easily. It is also slightly water-soluble — a YLF laser rod may very slowly dissolve in cooling water which surrounds it.

== Physical and chemical properties ==
Materials: Nd:LiYF4

Modulus of Elasticity: 85 GPa

Crystal Structure: Tetragonal

Cell Parameters: a=5.16 Å, c=10.85 Å

Melting Point: 819 °C

Mohs Hardness: 4~5

Density: 3.99 g/cm^3

Thermal Conductivity: 0.063 W/cm/K

Specific Heat: 0.79 J/g/K

== See also ==
- Neodymium doped yttrium orthovanadate (Nd:YVO_{4})
- Neodymium doped yttrium aluminum garnet (Nd:YAG) laser
