= Slope efficiency =

Rate of increase of a laser's output power with increasing input power

In laser science, slope efficiency is an important property of a laser. It is obtained by plotting the laser output power against the input pump power. Above the lasing threshold, the resulting curve is usually close to a straight line. The slope efficiency is the slope of this line. Slope efficiency can similarly be defined in terms of output and input energies instead of powers. This makes it applicable to pulsed lasers.

The curve described above is nearly linear above threshold when the optical losses in the laser cavity remain the same for all input powers. Sometimes the curve is nonlinear, typically with lower slope at high input powers. This is characteristic of increased losses, which are often thermal in nature, such as due to lensing. This is especially common in powerful lasers.

Whatever the shape of a slope efficiency curve, it should be possible to extrapolate the line of best fit to find the intercept with the x-axis. In this way the threshold pump power for this particular laser can be found. Determining the laser threshold periodically, via a slope efficiency graph, is particularly useful in helping to determine when a laser requires refurbishment.

The optimization of the laser output power for a given pump power usually involves a compromise between high slope efficiency and low threshold pump power.

== See also ==
- Energy conversion efficiency
