= Solar-pumped laser =

Laser that uses solar radiation for pumping the lasing medium

A solar-pumped laser (or solar-powered laser) is a laser that shares the same optical properties as conventional lasers such as emitting a beam consisting of coherent electromagnetic radiation which can reach high power, but which uses solar radiation for pumping the lasing medium. This type of laser is distinct from other types in that it does not require any artificial energy source.

== Lasing media ==
The two most studied lasing media for solar-pumped lasers have been iodine, with a laser wavelength of 1.31 micrometers, and NdCrYAG, which lases at 1.06 micrometers wavelength. Solar-pumped semiconductor lasers have also been proposed by Landis and others.

== Applications ==
Solar-pumped lasers are not used commercially because the low cost of electricity in most locations means that other more efficient types of lasers that run on electrical power can be more economically used. However, solar-pumped lasers might become useful in off-grid locations.

=== Nanopowders ===
Very fine dispersed powders can be produced by the use of laser synthesis technology.

=== Hydrogen production ===
A leader in this field is Shigeaki Uchida and his team in Japan (Tokyo/Osaka). Their design uses Fresnel lenses and a solar-pumped NdCrYAG laser to drive a magnesium-based cycle, which produces hydrogen gas as its product.

=== Potential spacecraft applications ===
Since there is no "grid" power in space, most spacecraft today use solar power sources, mostly photovoltaic solar cells. Powering lasers requires high levels of power, so the inefficiency of PV solar cells (usually less than 27% efficiency) motivates interest in solar pumping of lasers. Other potential benefits of solar-pumped lasers might be reduced mass and number of components, affording higher reliability (reduced number of failure modes) compared to an electrically pumped laser powered from PV cells. They can also be used for deep space communications, sensors for conditions on Earth, detecting and tracking objects in space, as well as power transmission.

==== Solar-energy conversion ====
There have been proposals to use solar-pumped laser to improve solar-energy conversion efficiently, taking advantage of laser amplification and intra-cavity use of a low-efficiency converter such as PV cells.

== Current research ==
A proposal to use the solar furnace of Uzbekistan to power a solar-pumped Nd:YAG laser would have been the world's largest system of its kind, at up to 1 MW of solar input power. However, current research efforts are focused on combining the output from several smaller concentrators, an approach that is much more achievable.

== See also ==
- Magnesium injection cycle
