= Caesium cadmium bromide =

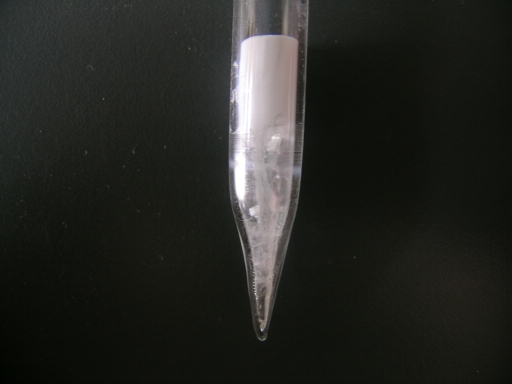
- CsCdBr3

Names
- IUPAC name Caesium cadmium bromide
- Other names: Caesium tribromocadmate

Identifiers
| CAS Number | 16593-55-8 |
| 3D model (JSmol) | Interactive image |
| PubChem CID | 19796927 |
- InChI: InChI=1S/3BrH.Cd.Cs/h3*1H;;/q;;;+2;+1/p-3 Key: UWRGVKVZETZALQ-UHFFFAOYSA-K
- SMILES: [Br-].[Br-].[Br-].[Cd+2].[Cs+]

Properties
| Chemical formula | Br_{3}CdCs |
| Molar mass | 485.031 g·mol^{−1} |
| Appearance | white or colourless solid |
| Density | 4.53 g/cm^{3} |
| Melting point | 450 °C (842 °F; 723 K) |

Structure
| Crystal structure | cubic |
- Except where otherwise noted, data are given for materials in their standard state (at 25 °C [77 °F], 100 kPa). verify (what is ?) Infobox references

Caesium cadmium bromide (CsCdBr_{3}) is a synthetic crystalline material. It belongs to the AMX_{3} group (where A = alkali metal, M = bivalent metal, X = halogen ion). Unlike most other bromides, CsCdBr_{3} is non-hygroscopic, giving it applications as an efficient upconversion material in solar cells. As a single crystal structure doped with rare-earth ions, it can be also used as active laser medium. It is highly transparent in the visible and infrared regions and can be used as a nonlinear optical crystal.

Caesium cadmium bromide with the formula Cs_{2}CdBr_{4} has also been synthesized.
