= Yttrium orthovanadate =

Names
- Other names Yttrium vanadate

Identifiers
CAS Number	13566-12-6
3D model (JSmol)	Interactive image
ChemSpider	75408
ECHA InfoCard	100.033.590
EC Number	234-340-8
CompTox Dashboard (EPA)	DTXSID20929103
- InChI: InChI=1S/4O.V.Y/q4*-2;+5;+3 Key: WTSZEAJEVDVRML-UHFFFAOYSA-N
- SMILES: [O-2].[O-2].[O-2].[O-2].[V+5].[Y+3]

Properties
Chemical formula	O_{4}VY
Molar mass	203.843 g·mol^{−1}
Melting point	1,810 °C (3,290 °F; 2,080 K)
- Except where otherwise noted, data are given for materials in their standard state (at 25 °C [77 °F], 100 kPa). Infobox references

Yttrium orthovanadate (YVO_{4}) is a transparent crystal. Undoped YVO_{4} is used to make efficient high-power polarizing prisms similar to Glan–Taylor prisms. With a chemical structure very similar to wakefieldite ([La,Ce,Nd,Y]VO_{4}), it is also sometimes used as a synthetic gemstone since the former is prohibitively rare.

There are two principal applications for doped yttrium orthovanadate:

- Doped with neodymium it forms Nd:YVO_{4}, an active laser medium used in diode-pumped solid-state lasers.
- Doped with europium it forms Eu:YVO_{4}, the dominant red phosphor used in cathode-ray tubes especially in color TVs.

== Basic properties ==
- Crystal structure:
  - Zircon tetragonal (tetragonal bipyramidal)
  - Space group D_{4h}
  - Lattice parameters a = b = 7.119 Å, c = 6.290 Å
- Density: 4.24 g/cm^{3}
- Melting point: 1810–1940 °C
- Mohs hardness: glass-like, ~5
- Knoop hardness: 480 kg/mm^{2}
- Thermal expansion coefficient:
  - α_{a} = 4.43×10^{−6}/K
  - α_{c} = 11.37×10^{−6}/K
- Thermal conductivity coefficient:
  - parallel to c-axis: 5.23 W·m^{−1}·K^{−1}
  - perpendicular to c-axis: 5.10 W·m^{−1}·K^{−1}
- Refractive indices, birefringence ( Δn = n_{e} - n_{o}) and walk-off angle at 45° (ρ):
  - at 0.63 μm:
    - n_{e} = 2.2154
    - n_{o} = 1.9929
    - Δn = 0.2225
    - ρ = 6.04
  - at 1.30 μm:
    - n_{e} = 2.1554
    - n_{o} = 1.9500
    - Δn = 0.2054
    - ρ= 5.72
  - at 1.55 μm:
    - n_{e} = 2.1486
    - n_{o} = 1.9447
    - Δn = 0.2039
    - ρ = 5.69
  - Sellmeier equation (λ in μm):
    - n_{e}^{2}=4.59905 + 0.110534/(λ^{2} − 0.04813) − 0.012267612 λ^{2}
    - n_{o}^{2}=3.77834 + 0.069736/(λ^{2} − 0.04724) − 0.0108133 λ^{2}

== See also ==
- Neodymium-doped yttrium orthovanadate
