= Magnesium injection cycle =

The magnesium injection cycle (MAGIC) is an engine design under development by Mitsubishi Corporation and the Tokyo Institute of Technology that uses magnesium and water to generate power. The engine also makes use of solar-powered lasers.

== Overview ==
The joint project, initiated in 2005 and still in the experimental stage, developed a prototype carbon dioxide (CO_{2})-free engine in 2006 that ran successfully without the need for fossil fuels. The chemical reaction between magnesium (in a powder form) and water at room temperature produces high-energy steam and hydrogen. The hydrogen is burned at the same time to produce additional high-energy steam. These two steam sources power the engine. The energy cycle produces no carbon dioxide or other harmful emissions. The only by-products of this reaction are water and magnesium oxide. The magnesium (a common metallic element) is separated from the oxygen through a solar-powered laser process (the development of which is already well advanced) and is reused over and over again as fuel.

== Output ==
Despite its small dimensions (about 5 cm in diameter and 13.5 cm in height), the engine can generate a heat output of several tens of kilowatts, from which power is obtained. The engine is intended for use in cogeneration, automobiles, ships, and many other areas. A statement in 2006 claimed that further research was planned to achieve commercialization within the next three years. No updated timeline has been released.

== Personnel ==
The engine development was led by Professor Takashi Yabe with the help of Professor Ikuta and others of Tokyo Institute of Technology with the cooperation of Ono Denki Seisakusho, K.K., a precision manufacturer located in Shinagawa, Tokyo. Professor Yabe performed experiments of the technology in 2007 at the Hokkaido Toyako G8 environmental summit hosted in Chitose, Japan.

== See also ==
- Alternative fuel
