= Neodymium-doped yttrium orthovanadate =

Laser gain medium

Neodymium-doped yttrium orthovanadate (Nd:YVO_{4}) is a crystalline material formed by adding neodymium ions to yttrium orthovanadate. It is commonly used as an active laser medium for diode-pumped solid-state lasers. It comes as a transparent blue-tinted material, which varies to purplish depending on lighting, similar to alexandrite. It is birefringent, therefore rods made of it are usually rectangular.

As in all neodymium-doped laser crystals, the lasing action of Nd:YVO_{4} is due to its content of neodymium ions, which may be excited by visible or infrared light, and undergo an electronic transition resulting in emission of coherent infrared light at a lower frequency, usually at 1064 nm (other transitions in Nd are available, and can be selected for by external optics).

== Basic properties ==
- Atomic density: ~1.37×10^{20} atoms/cm^{3}
- Crystal structure:
  - zircon tetragonal (tetragonal bipyramidal)
  - space group D_{4h}
  - a=b=7.12, c=6.29
- Density: 4.22 g/cm^{3}
- Mohs hardness: Glass-like, ~5
- Thermal expansion coefficient:
  - α_{a}=4.43×10^{−6}/K
  - α_{c}=11.37×10^{−6}/K
- Thermal conductivity:
  - parallel to C-axis: 5.23 W·m^{−1}·K^{−1}
  - perpendicular to C-axis: 5.10 W·m^{−1}·K^{−1}

== Optical properties ==
- Lasing wavelengths: 914 nm, 1064 nm, 1342 nm
- Crystal class: positive uniaxial, n_{o}=n_{a}=n_{b}, n_{e}=n_{c},
  - n_{o}=1.9573, n_{e}=2.1652, at 1064 nm
  - n_{o}=1.9721, n_{e}=2.1858, at 808 nm
  - n_{o}=2.0210, n_{e}=2.2560, at 532 nm
- Fluorescence lifetime (spontaneous emission lifetime) as a function of Nd ions concentration:

Nd concentration (atom %)	Fluorescence lifetime (μs)@ 1064 nm	Reference
0.4	110	J. Appl. Phys. 49, 5517-5522 (1978).
1.0	100	Castech web site
1.1	90	Casix web site
2.0	50	Casix web site

- Absorption cross-section at 808 nm: 5.5×10^{−20} cm^{2}
- Emission cross-section at 1064 nm: 30×10^{−19} cm^{2} (Reference: JOSA 66, 1405-1414 (1976).)
- Polarized laser emission: π-polarization; parallel to optic axis (c-axis) (for a-cut crystal)
- Gain-bandwidth: 0.96 nm (257 GHz) at 1064 nm (for 1.1 atm% Nd doped)
- Absorption coefficients at 808 nm for different doping concentrations:

== See also ==
- Yttrium aluminium garnet (YAG)
