= Lithium holmium fluoride =

Chemical compound with unusual magnetic properties

Identifiers
3D model (JSmol)	Interactive image
- InChI: InChI=1S/4FH.Ho.Li/h4*1H;;/q;;;;+3;+1/p-4 Key: LBURCHZQDITKAP-UHFFFAOYSA-J
- SMILES: [Li+].[Ho+3].[F-].[F-].[F-].[F-]

Properties
Chemical formula	F_{4}HoLi
Molar mass	247.86 g·mol^{−1}

Related compounds
Other cations	Yttrium lithium fluoride
- Except where otherwise noted, data are given for materials in their standard state (at 25 °C [77 °F], 100 kPa). Infobox references

Lithium holmium fluoride is a ternary salt with chemical formula LiHoF_{4}. At temperatures below 1.53 K, it is ferromagnetic described by the Ising model, but the interaction coefficients arise through superexchange. Above that temperature, it paramagnetizes. Even at 0 K, LiHoF_{4} exhibits a quantum phase transition, aligning with an external magnetic field.
