= Quasi-continuous function =

In mathematics, the notion of a quasi-continuous function is similar to, but weaker than, the notion of a continuous function. All continuous functions are quasi-continuous but the converse is not true in general.

== Definition ==
Let $X$ be a topological space. A real-valued function $f:X \rightarrow \mathbb{R}$ is quasi-continuous at a point $x \in X$ if for any $\epsilon > 0$ and any open neighborhood $U$ of $x$ there is a non-empty open set $G \subset U$ such that

$$|f(x) - f(y)| < \epsilon \;\;\;\; \forall y \in G$$

Note that in the above definition, it is not necessary that $x \in G$.

== Properties ==
- If $f: X \rightarrow \mathbb{R}$ is continuous then $f$ is quasi-continuous
- If $f: X \rightarrow \mathbb{R}$ is continuous and $g: X \rightarrow \mathbb{R}$ is quasi-continuous, then $f+g$ is quasi-continuous.

== Example ==
Consider the function $f: \mathbb{R} \rightarrow \mathbb{R}$ defined by $f(x) = 0$ whenever $x \leq 0$ and $f(x) = 1$ whenever $x > 0$. Clearly f is continuous everywhere except at x=0, thus quasi-continuous everywhere except (at most) at x=0. At x=0, take any open neighborhood U of x. Then there exists an open set $G \subset U$ such that $y < 0 \; \forall y \in G$. Clearly this yields $|f(0) - f(y)| = 0 \; \forall y \in G$ thus f is quasi-continuous.

In contrast, the function $g: \mathbb{R} \rightarrow \mathbb{R}$ defined by $g(x) = 0$ whenever $x$ is a rational number and $g(x) = 1$ whenever $x$ is an irrational number is nowhere quasi-continuous, since every nonempty open set $G$ contains some $y_1, y_2$ with $|g(y_1) - g(y_2)| = 1$.

== See also ==
- Cliquish function
