= Lasing threshold =

Input power level at which a laser generates light primarily by stimulated emission

In laser science, the lasing threshold is the lowest excitation level at which a laser's output is dominated by stimulated emission rather than by spontaneous emission. Below the threshold, the laser's output power rises slowly with increasing excitation. Above the threshold, the slope of power vs. excitation is orders of magnitude greater. The linewidth of the laser's emission also becomes orders of magnitude smaller above the threshold than it is below. Above the threshold, the laser is said to be lasing. The term "lasing" is a back formation from "laser," which is an acronym, not an agent noun.

== Theory ==
The lasing threshold is reached when the optical gain of the laser medium is exactly balanced by the sum of all the losses experienced by light in one round trip of the laser's optical cavity. This can be expressed, assuming steady-state operation, as

$$R_1 R_2\exp(2g_\text{threshold}\,l) \exp(-2\alpha l) = 1$$.

Here $R_1$ and $R_2$ are the mirror (power) reflectivities, $l$ is the length of the gain medium, $\exp(2g_\text{threshold}\,l)$ is the round-trip threshold power gain, and $\exp(-2\alpha l)$ is the round trip power loss. Note that $\alpha>0$. This equation separates the losses in a laser into localised losses due to the mirrors, over which the experimenter has control, and distributed losses such as absorption and scattering. The experimenter typically has little control over the distributed losses.

The optical loss is nearly constant for any particular laser ($\alpha=\alpha_{0}$), especially close to threshold. Under this assumption the threshold condition can be rearranged as

$$g_\text{threshold} = \alpha_{0} - \frac{1}{2l} \ln (R_1 R_2)$$.

Since $R_1 R_2 < 1$, both terms on the right side are positive, hence both terms increase the required threshold gain parameter. This means that minimising the gain parameter $g_\text{threshold}$ requires low distributed losses and high reflectivity mirrors. The appearance of $l$ in the denominator suggests that the required threshold gain would be decreased by lengthening the gain medium, but this is not generally the case. The dependence on $l$ is more complicated because $\alpha_{0}$ generally increases with $l$ due to diffraction losses.

=== Measuring the internal losses ===
The analysis above is predicated on the laser operating in a steady-state at the laser threshold. However, this is not an assumption which can ever be fully satisfied. The problem is that the laser output power varies by orders of magnitude depending on whether the laser is above or below threshold. When very close to threshold, the smallest perturbation is able to cause huge swings in the output laser power. The formalism can, however, be used to obtain good measurements of the internal losses of the laser as follows:

Most types of laser use one mirror that is highly reflecting, and another (called the output coupler) that is partially reflective. Reflectivities greater than 99.5% are routinely achieved in dielectric mirrors. The analysis can be simplified by taking $R_1 = 1$. The reflectivity of the output coupler can then be denoted $R_\text{OC}$. The equation above then simplifies to

$$2g_\text{threshold}\,l = 2\alpha_{0}l - \ln R_\text{OC}$$.

In most cases the pumping power required to achieve lasing threshold will be proportional to the left side of the equation, that is $P_\text{threshold} \propto 2g_\text{threshold}\,l$. (This analysis is equally applicable to considering the threshold energy instead of the threshold power. This is more relevant for pulsed lasers). The equation can be rewritten:

$$P_\text{threshold} = K(\,L - \ln R_\text{OC}\,)$$,

where $L$ is defined by $L = 2\alpha_{0}l$ and $K$ is a constant. This relationship allows the variable $L$ to be determined experimentally.

In order to use this expression, a series of slope efficiencies have to be obtained from a laser, with each slope obtained using a different output coupler reflectivity. The power threshold in each case is given by the intercept of the slope with the x-axis. The resulting power thresholds are then plotted versus $-\ln R_\text{OC}$. The theory above suggests that this graph is a straight line. A line can be fitted to the data and the intercept of the line with the x-axis found. At this point the x value is equal to the round trip loss $L = 2\alpha_{0}l$. Quantitative estimates of $g_\text{threshold}$ can then be made.

One of the appealing features of this analysis is that all of the measurements are made with the laser operating above the laser threshold. This allows for measurements with low random error, however it does mean that each estimate of $P_\text{threshold}$ requires extrapolation.

A good empirical discussion of laser loss quantification is given in the book by W. Koechner.
