= Youth Leader Fund =

Educational program by the United Nations

The Youth Leader Fund for a World Without Nuclear Weapons (commonly abbreviated as YLF) is an international educational initiative started in 2023 by the United Nations Office for Disarmament Affairs (UNODA), with financial support from the Government of Japan. The program aims to educate youth globally to advocate for nuclear disarmament and non-proliferation.

== History ==
YLF was started as a multi-phase program running from 2023 to 2030, aligning with milestones such as the 85th anniversary of the atomic bombings of Hiroshima and Nagasaki and the 60th anniversary of the Treaty on the Non-Proliferation of Nuclear Weapons (NPT).

== Structure ==
The program is open to individuals aged 18 to 29 from all countries, including both nuclear-weapon and non-nuclear-weapon states. Each phase of YLF spans two years and comprises two main components:

1. Online Learning Module: Participants engage in a four-month virtual curriculum covering topics such as nuclear disarmament, non-proliferation, and arms control. The module includes interactive discussions, live webinars, and skill-building workshops to equip participants with theoretical knowledge and practical advocacy skills.
2. In-Person Study Tour: Upon successful completion of the online module, 50 selected participants undertake a fully funded six day study tour to Hiroshima and Nagasaki. During the visit, participants meet with hibakusha (atomic bomb survivors), engage with local youth and experts, and visit historical sites to gain insight into the consequences of nuclear warfare.

== Funding and support ==
YLF is funded by the Government of Japan as part of the Hiroshima Action Plan, announced by Prime Minister Fumio Kishida at the 10th Review Conference of the NPT in August 2022. The initiative reflects Japan's commitment to nuclear disarmament education and its historical experiences as the only country to have suffered atomic bombings.
