= Laser pumping =

Powering mechanism for lasers

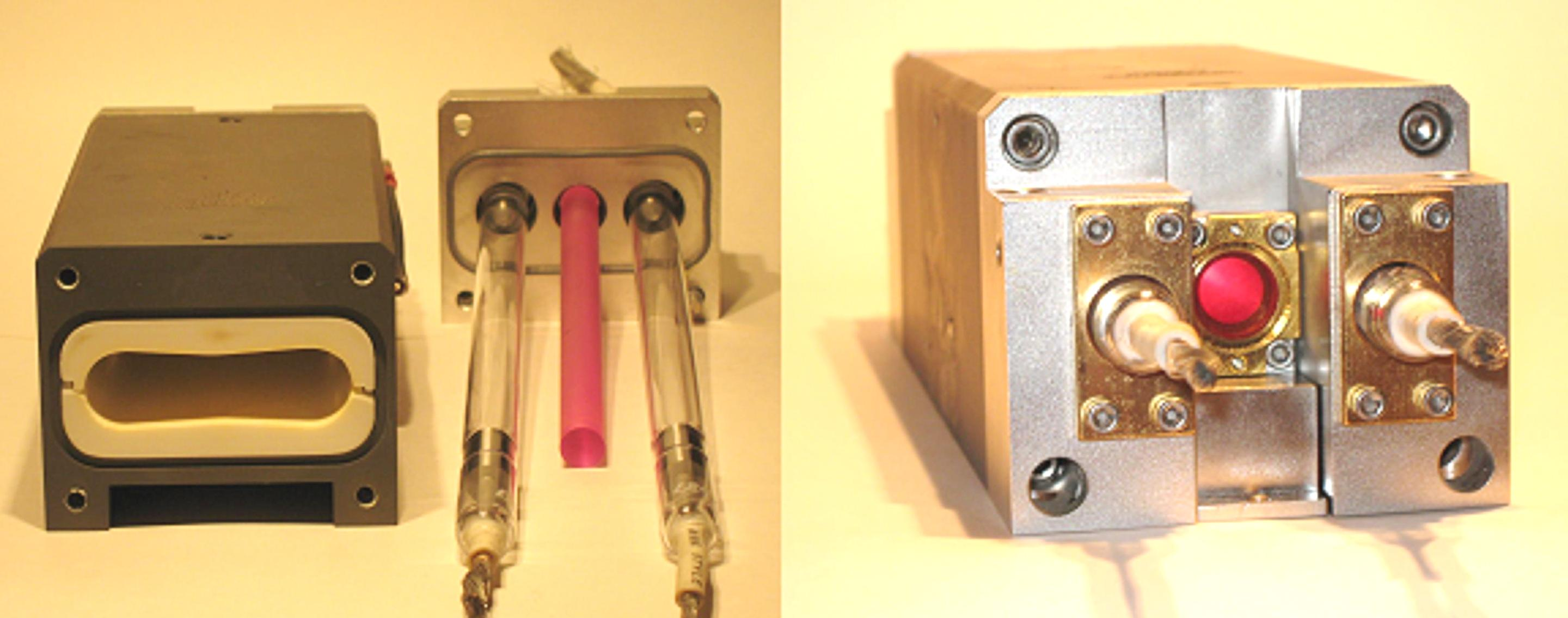
A ruby laser head. The photo on the left shows the head unassembled, revealing the pumping cavity, the rod and the flashlamps. The photo on the right shows the head assembled.

Laser pumping is the act of energy transfer from an external source into the gain medium of a laser. The energy is absorbed in the medium, producing excited states in its atoms. When for a period of time the number of particles in one excited state exceeds the number of particles in the ground state or a less-excited state, population inversion is achieved. In this condition, the mechanism of stimulated emission can take place and the medium can act as a laser or an optical amplifier. The pump power must be higher than the lasing threshold of the laser.

The pump energy is usually provided in the form of light or electric current, but more exotic sources have been used, such as chemical or nuclear reactions.

== Optical pumping ==
=== Pumping cavities ===
A laser pumped with an arc lamp or a flashlamp is usually pumped through the lateral wall of the lasing medium, which is often in the form of a crystal rod containing a metallic impurity or a glass tube containing a liquid dye, in a condition known as "side-pumping." To use the lamp's energy most efficiently, the lamps and lasing medium are contained in a reflective cavity that will redirect most of the lamp's energy into the rod or dye cell.

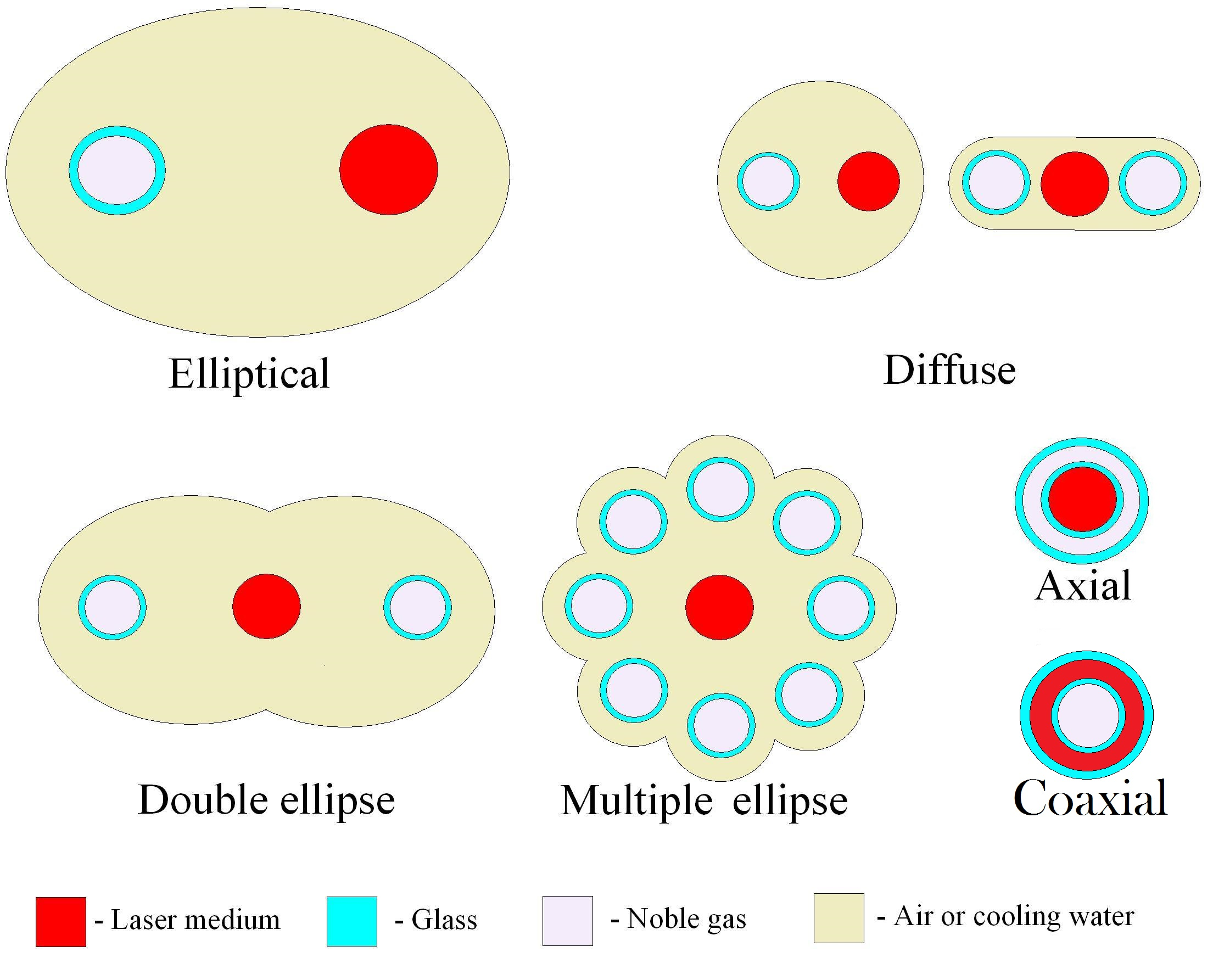
Various laser pumping cavity configurations.

In the most common configuration, the gain medium is in the form of a rod located at one focus of a mirrored cavity, consisting of an elliptical cross-section perpendicular to the rod's axis. The flashlamp is a tube located at the other focus of the ellipse. Often the mirror's coating is chosen to reflect wavelengths that are shorter than the lasing output while absorbing or transmitting wavelengths that are the same or longer, to minimize thermal lensing. In other cases an absorber for the longer wavelengths is used. Often, the lamp is surrounded by a cylindrical jacket called a flow tube. This flow tube is usually made of a glass that will absorb unsuitable wavelengths, such as ultraviolet, or provide a path for cooling water which absorbs infrared. Often, the jacket is given a dielectric coating that reflects unsuitable wavelengths of light back into the lamp. This light is absorbed and some of it is re-emitted at suitable wavelengths. The flow tube also serves to protect the rod in the event of a violent lamp failure.

Smaller ellipses create fewer reflections, (a condition called "close-coupling"), giving higher intensity in the center of the rod. For a single flashlamp, if the lamp and rod are equal diameter, an ellipse that is twice as wide as it is high is usually the most efficient at imaging the light into the rod. The rod and the lamp are relatively long to minimize the effect of losses at the end faces and to provide a sufficient length of gain medium. Longer flashlamps are also more efficient at transferring electrical energy into light, due to higher impedance. However, if the rod is too long in relation to its diameter a condition called "prelasing" can occur, depleting the rod's energy before it can properly build up. Rod ends are often antireflection coated or cut at Brewster's angle to minimize this effect. Flat mirrors are also often used at the ends of the pump cavity to reduce loss.

Variations on this design use more complex mirrors composed of overlapping elliptical shapes, to allow multiple flashlamps to pump a single rod. This allows greater power, but are less efficient because not all of the light is correctly imaged into the rod, leading to increased thermal losses. These losses can be minimized by using a close-coupled cavity. This approach may allow more symmetric pumping, increasing beam quality, however.

Another configuration uses a rod and a flashlamp in a cavity made of a diffuse reflecting material, such as spectralon or powdered barium sulfate. These cavities are often circular or oblong, as focusing the light is not a primary objective. This doesn't couple the light as well into the lasing medium, since the light makes many reflections before reaching the rod, but often requires less maintenance than metalized reflectors. The increased number of reflections is compensated for by the diffuse medium's higher reflectivity: 99% compared to 97% for a gold mirror. This approach is more compatible with unpolished rods or multiple lamps.

Parasitic modes occur when reflections are generated in directions other than along the length of the rod, which can use up energy that would otherwise be available to the beam. This can be a particular problem if the barrel of the rod is polished. Cylindrical laser rods support whispering gallery modes due to total internal reflection between the rod and the cooling water, which reflect continuously around the circumference of the rod. Light pipe modes can reflect down the length of the rod in a zig-zag path. If the rod has an antireflection coating, or is immersed in a fluid that matches its refractive index, it can dramatically reduce these parasitic reflections. Likewise, if the barrel of the rod is rough ground (frosted), or grooved, internal reflections can be dispersed.

Pumping with a single lamp tends to focus most of the energy on one side, worsening the beam profile. It is common for rods to have a frosted barrel, to diffuse the light, providing a more even distribution of light throughout the rod. This allows more energy absorption throughout the gain medium for a better transverse mode. A frosted flow tube or diffuse reflector, while leading to lowered transfer efficiency, helps increase this effect, improving the gain.

Laser host materials are chosen to have a low absorption; only the dopant absorbs. Therefore, any light at frequencies not absorbed by the doping will go back into the lamp and reheat the plasma, shortening lamp life.

=== Flashlamp pumping ===
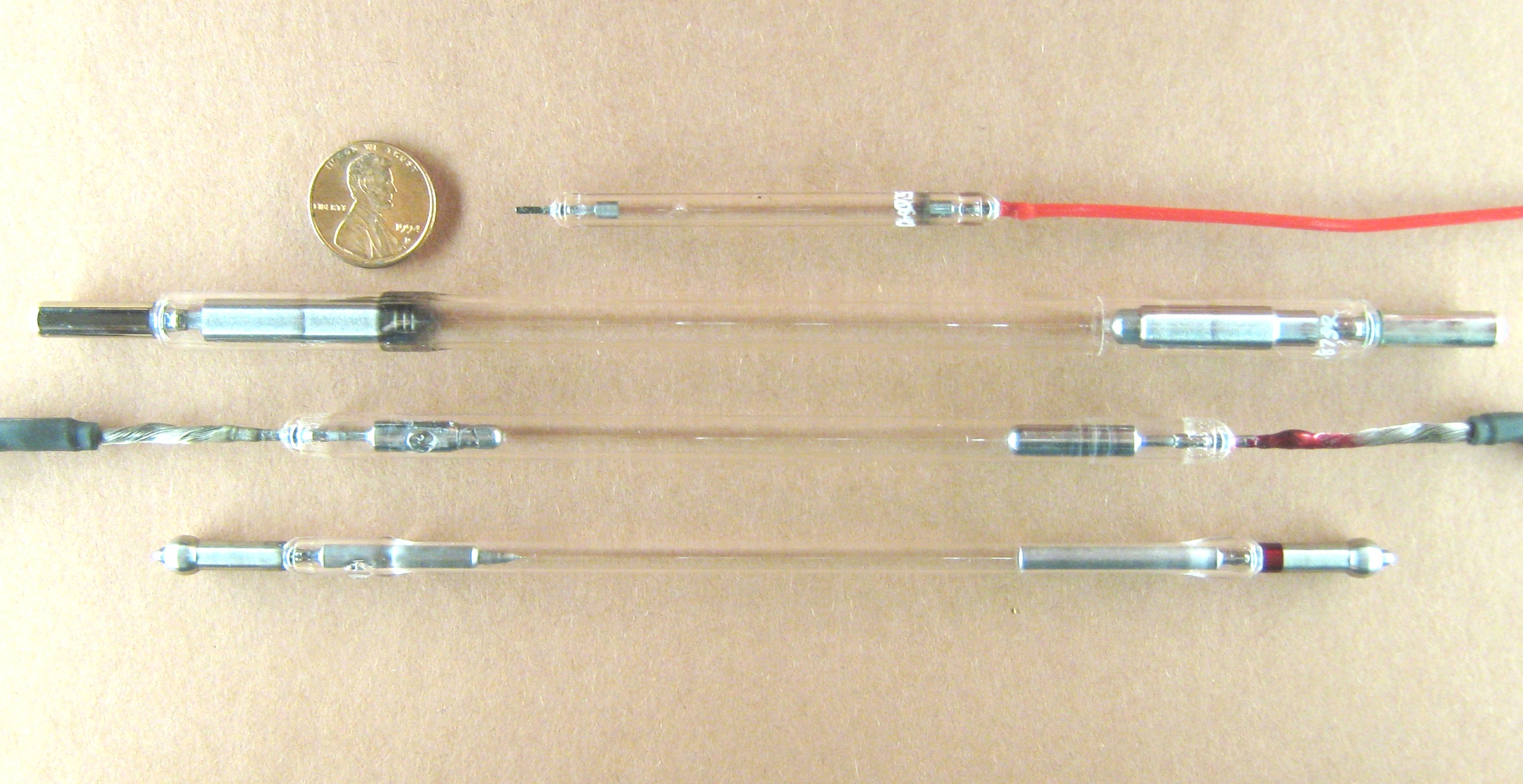
Laser pumping lamps. The top three are xenon flashlamps while the bottom one is a krypton arc lamp

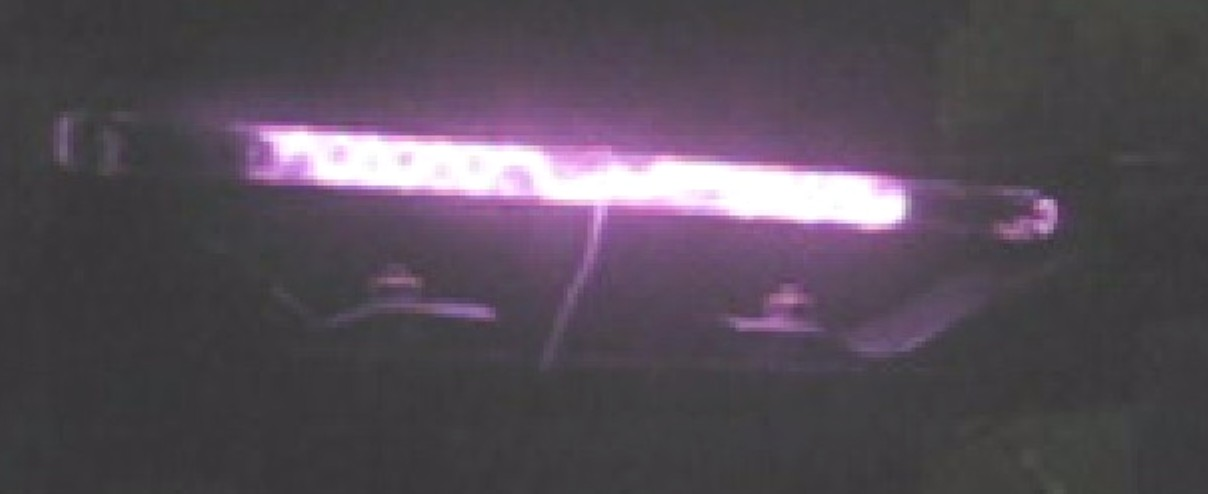
External triggering was used in this extremely fast discharge. Due to the very high speed, (3.5 microseconds), the current is not only unable to fully heat the xenon and fill the tube, but is still in direct contact with the glass.

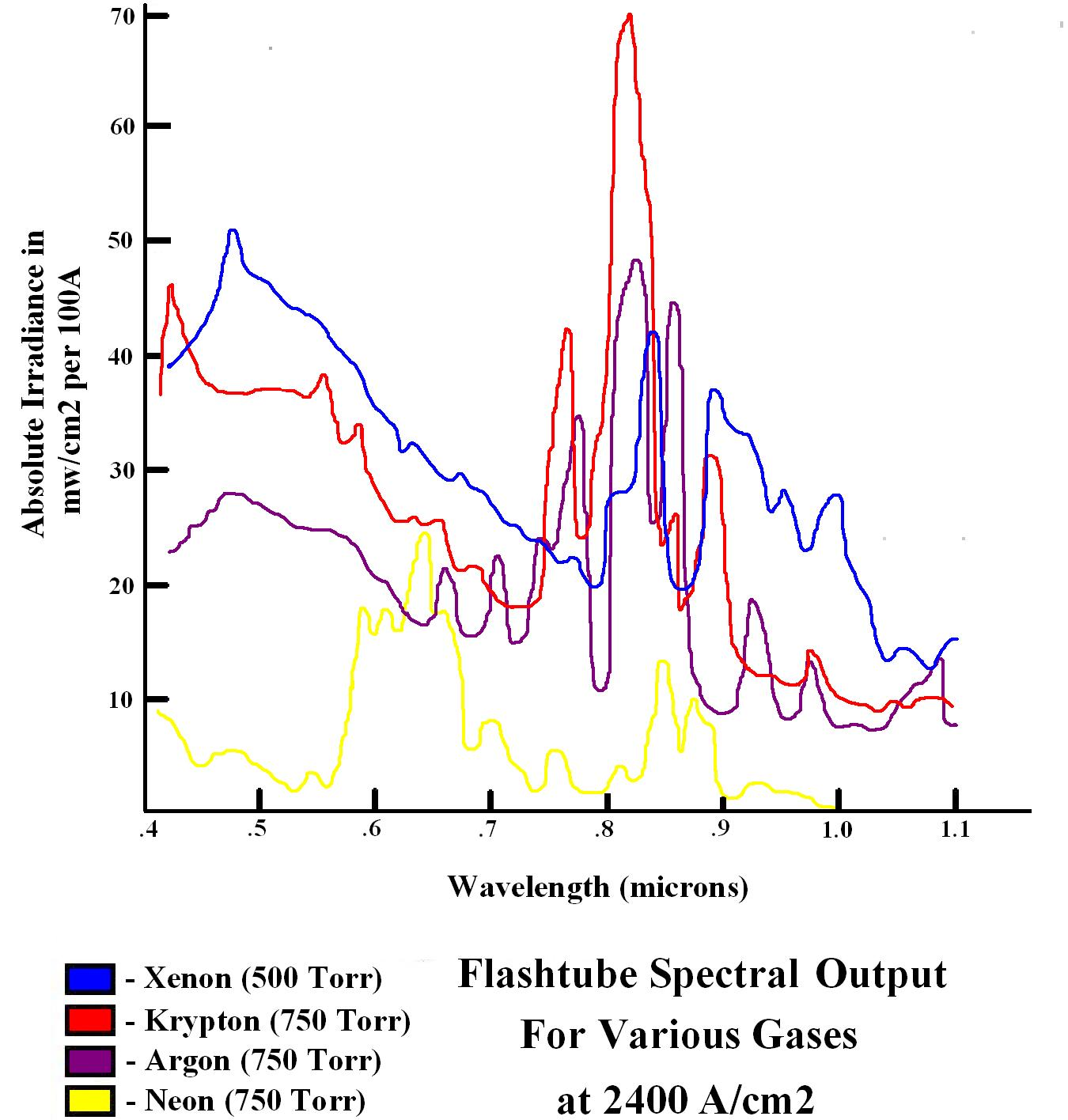
The spectral outputs for flashlamps using various gases, at a current density approaching that of greybody radiation.

Flashlamps were the earliest energy source for lasers. They are used for high pulsed energies in both solid-state and dye lasers. They produce a broad spectrum of light, causing most of the energy to be wasted as heat in the gain medium. Flashlamps also tend to have a short lifetime. The first laser consisted of a helical flashlamp surrounding a ruby rod.

Quartz flashlamps are the most common type used in lasers, and, at low energies or high repetition rates, can operate at temperatures as high as 900 °C. Higher average powers or repetition rates require water cooling. The water usually has to wash across not only the arc length of the lamp, but across the electrode portion of the glass as well. Water-cooled flashlamps are usually manufactured with the glass shrunken around the electrode to allow direct cooling of the tungsten. If the electrode is allowed to heat much more than the glass thermal expansion can crack the seal.

Lamp lifetime depends primarily on the energy regime used for the particular lamp. Low energies give rise to sputter, which can remove material from the cathode and redeposit it on the glass, creating a darkened, mirrored appearance. The life expectancy at low energies can be quite unpredictable. High energies cause wall ablation, which not only gives the glass a cloudy appearance, but also weakens it structurally and releases oxygen, affecting pressure, but at these energy levels the life expectancy can be calculated with a fair amount of accuracy.

Pulse duration can also affect lifetime. Very long pulses can strip large amounts of material from the cathode, depositing it on the walls. With very short pulse durations, care must be taken to ensure that the arc is centered in the lamp, far away from the glass, preventing serious wall ablation. External triggering is not usually recommended for short pulses. Simmer voltage triggering is usually used for extremely fast discharges, as are used in dye lasers, and often combine this with a "pre-pulse technique", where as a small flash is initiated just milliseconds before the main flash, to preheat the gas for a faster rise time.

Dye lasers sometimes use "axial pumping," which consists of a hollow, annular shaped flashlamp, with the outer envelope mirrored to reflect suitable light back to the center. The dye cell is placed in the middle, providing a more even distribution of pumping light, and more efficient transfer of energy. The hollow flashlamp also has lower inductance than a normal flashlamp, which provides a shorter flash discharge. Rarely, a "coaxial" design is used for dye lasers, which consists of a normal flashlamp surrounded by an annular shaped dye cell. This provides better transfer efficiency, eliminating the need for a reflector, but diffraction losses cause a lower gain.

The output spectrum of a flashlamp is primarily a product of its current density. After determining the "explosion energy" for the pulse duration, (the amount of energy that will destroy it in one to ten flashes), and choosing a safe energy level for operation, the balance of voltage and capacitance can be adjusted to center the output anywhere from the near infrared to the far ultraviolet. Low current densities result from the use of very high voltage and low current. This produces broadened spectral lines with the output centered in the near-IR, and is best for pumping infrared lasers such as Nd:YAG and erbium:YAG. Higher current densities broaden the spectral lines to the point where they begin to blend together, and continuum emission is produced. Longer wavelengths reach saturation levels at lower current densities than shorter wavelengths, so as current is increased the output center will shift toward the visual spectrum, which is better for pumping visible light lasers, such as ruby. At this point, the gas becomes nearly an ideal "greybody radiator." Even higher current densities will produce blackbody radiation, centering the output in the ultraviolet.

Xenon is used extensively because of its good efficiency, although krypton is often used for pumping neodymium doped laser rods. This is because the spectral lines in the near-IR range better match the absorption lines of neodymium, giving krypton better transfer efficiency even though its overall power output is lower. This is especially effective with Nd:YAG, which has a narrow absorption profile. Pumped with krypton, these lasers can achieve up to twice the output power obtainable from xenon. Spectral line emission is usually chosen when pumping Nd:YAG with krypton, but since all of xenon's spectral lines miss the absorption bands of Nd:YAG, when pumping with xenon the continuum emission is used.

=== Arc lamp pumping ===
Optical pumping of a laser rod (bottom) with an arc lamp (top). Red: hot. Blue: cold. Green: light. Non-green arrows: water flow. Solid colors: metal. Light colors: fused quartz.

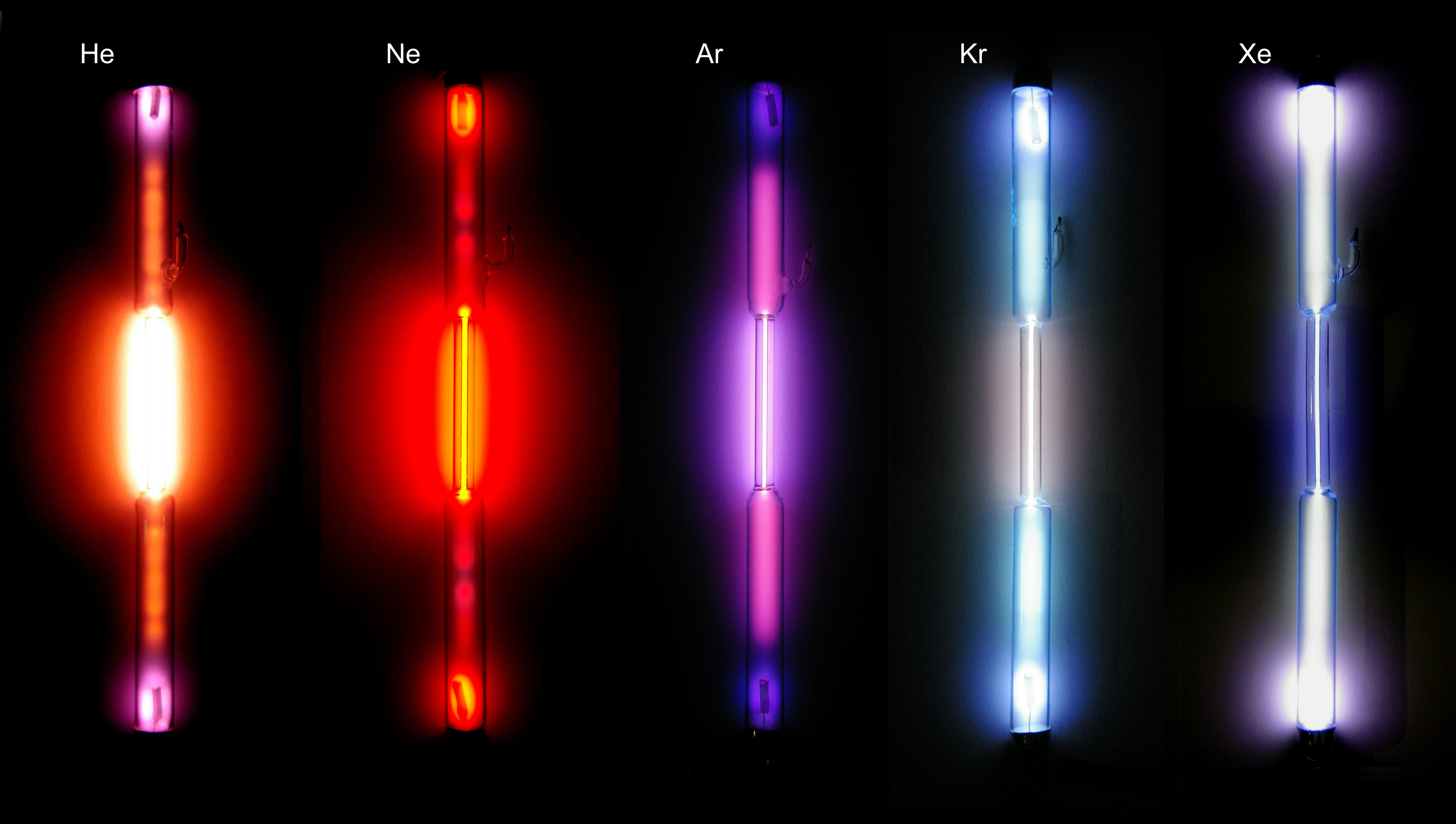
These gas-discharge lamps show the spectral line outputs of the various noble gases.

Arc lamps are used for pumping rods that can support continuous operation, and can be made any size and power. Typical arc lamps operate at a voltage high enough to maintain the certain current level for which the lamp was designed to operate. This is often in the range of 10 to 50 amps. Due to their very high pressures, arc lamps require specially designed circuitry for start up, or "striking" the arc. Striking usually occurs in three phases. In the triggering phase, an extremely high voltage pulse from the "series triggering" transformer creates a spark streamer between the electrodes, but the impedance is too high for the main voltage to take over. A "boost voltage" phase is then initiated, where a voltage that is higher than the voltage drop between the electrodes is driven through the lamp, until the gas is heated to a plasma state. When impedance becomes low enough, the "current control" phase takes over, where the main voltage begins to drive the current to a stable level.

Arc lamp pumping takes place in a cavity similar to a flashlamp pumped laser, with a rod and one or more lamps in a reflector cavity. The exact shape of the cavity is often dependent on how many lamps are used. The main difference is in the cooling. Arc lamps need to be cooled with water, ensuring that the water washes beyond the glass, and across the electrode connectors as well. This requires the use of deionized water with a resistivity of at least 200 kilohms, to keep from shorting out the circuit and corroding the electrodes through electrolysis. Water is typically channeled through a flow tube at a rate of 4 to 10 liters per minute.

Arc lamps come in nearly all of the noble gas types, including xenon, krypton, argon, neon, and helium, which all emit spectral lines that are very specific to the gas. The output spectrum of an arc lamp is mostly dependent on the gas type, being narrow band spectral lines very similar to a flashlamp operated at low current densities. The output is highest in the near infrared, and are usually used to pump infrared lasers such as Nd:YAG.

=== External laser pumping ===
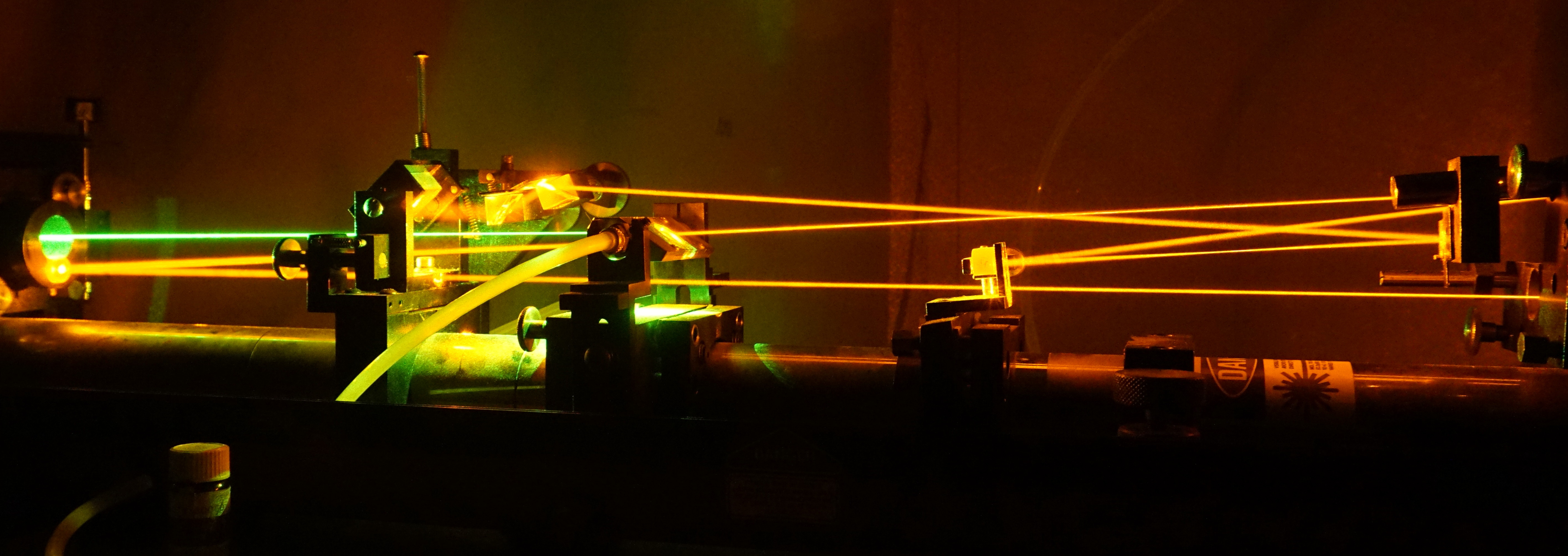
A dye laser tuned to 589nm (amber yellow), pumped with an external, frequency-doubled Nd:YAG laser @ 532nm (yellowish-green). The closeness between wavelengths results in a very small Stokes shift, reducing energy losses.

A laser of a suitable type can be used to pump another laser. The pump laser's narrow spectrum allows it to be closely matched to the absorption lines of the lasing media, giving it much more efficient energy transfer than the broadband emission of flashlamps. Diode lasers pump solid state lasers and liquid dye lasers. A ring laser design is often used, especially in dye lasers. The ring laser uses three or more mirrors to reflect light in a circular path. This helps eliminate the standing wave generated by most Fabry–Pérot resonators, leading to a better use of the gain medium's energy.

=== Other optical pumping methods ===
Microwaves or radiofrequency EM radiation can be used to excite gas lasers.

A solar-pumped laser uses solar radiation as a pump source.

== Electrical pumping ==
Electric glow discharge is common in gas lasers. For example, in the helium–neon laser the electrons from the discharge collide with the helium atoms, exciting them. The excited helium atoms then collide with neon atoms, transferring energy. This allows an inverse population of neon atoms to build up.

Electric current is typically used to pump laser diodes and semiconductor crystal lasers (for example germanium)

Electron beams pump free electron lasers and some excimer lasers.

== Gas dynamic pumping ==
Gas dynamic lasers are constructed using the supersonic flow of gases, such as carbon dioxide, to excite the molecules past threshold. The gas is pressurized and then heated to as high as 1400 kelvins. The gas is then allowed to expand rapidly through specially shaped nozzles to a very low pressure. This expansion occurs at supersonic velocities, sometimes as high as mach 4. The hot gas has many molecules in the upper excited states, while many more are in the lower states. The rapid expansion causes adiabatic cooling, which reduces the temperature to as low as 300 K. This reduction in temperature causes the molecules in the upper and lower states to relax their equilibrium to a value that is more appropriate for the lower temperature. However, the molecules in the lower states relax very quickly, while the upper state molecules take much longer to relax. Since a good quantity of molecules remain in the upper state, a population inversion is created, which often extends for quite a distance downstream. Continuous wave outputs as high as 100 kilowatts have been obtained from dynamic carbon dioxide lasers.

Similar methods of supersonic expansion are used to adiabatically cool carbon monoxide lasers, which are then pumped either through chemical reaction, electrical, or radio frequency pumping. The adiabatic cooling replaces bulky and costly cryogenic cooling with liquid nitrogen, increasing the carbon monoxide laser's efficiency. Lasers of this type have been able to produce outputs as high as a gigawatt, with efficiencies as high as 60%.

== Other types ==
Charge-displacement self-channeling can give rise to high energy concentration along a column created and maintained by the ponderomotive expulsion of electrons. The channel will also columnate shorter wavelength secondary radiation and ultimately extremely short wavelength lasing.

Chemical reaction is used as a power source in chemical lasers. This allows for very high output powers difficult to reach by other means.

Nuclear fission is used in exotic nuclear pumped lasers (NPL), directly employing the energy of the fast neutrons released in a nuclear reactor.

The United States military tested an X-ray laser pumped by a nuclear weapon in the 1980s, but the results of the test were inconclusive and it has not been repeated.

== See also ==
- Laser construction
