= Active laser medium =

Source of optical gain in a laser

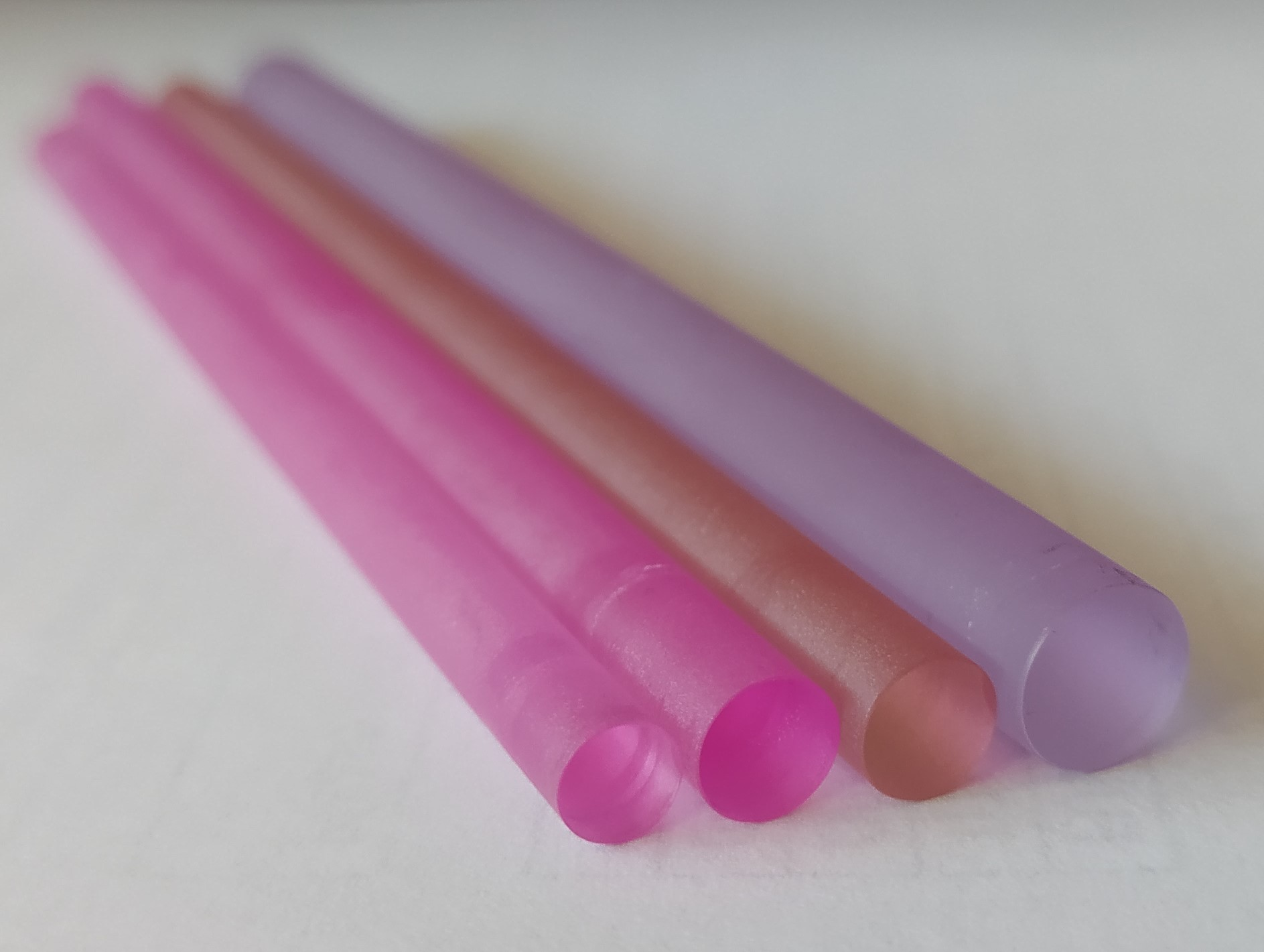
Laser rods (from left to right): Ruby, alexandrite, Er:YAG, Nd:YAG

The active laser medium (also called a gain medium or lasing medium) is the source of optical gain within a laser. The gain results from the stimulated emission of photons through electronic or molecular transitions to a lower energy state from a higher energy state previously populated by a pump source.

Examples of active laser media include:

- Certain crystals, typically doped with rare-earth ions (e.g. neodymium, ytterbium, or erbium) or transition metal ions (titanium or chromium); most often yttrium aluminium garnet (Y_{3}Al_{5}O_{12}), yttrium orthovanadate (YVO_{4}), or sapphire (Al_{2}O_{3}); and not often caesium cadmium bromide (CsCdBr_{3}) (solid-state lasers)
- Glasses, e.g. silicate or phosphate glasses, doped with laser-active ions;
- Gases, e.g. mixtures of helium and neon (HeNe), nitrogen, argon, krypton, carbon monoxide, carbon dioxide, or metal vapors; (gas lasers)
- Semiconductors, e.g. gallium arsenide (GaAs), indium gallium arsenide (InGaAs), or gallium nitride (GaN).
- Liquids, in the form of dye solutions as used in dye lasers.

In order to fire a laser, the active gain medium must be changed into a state in which population inversion occurs. The preparation of this state requires an external energy source and is known as laser pumping. Pumping may be achieved with electrical currents (e.g. semiconductors, or gases via high-voltage discharges) or with light, generated by discharge lamps or by other lasers (semiconductor lasers). More exotic gain media can be pumped by chemical reactions, nuclear fission, or with high-energy electron beams.

== Example of a model of gain medium ==
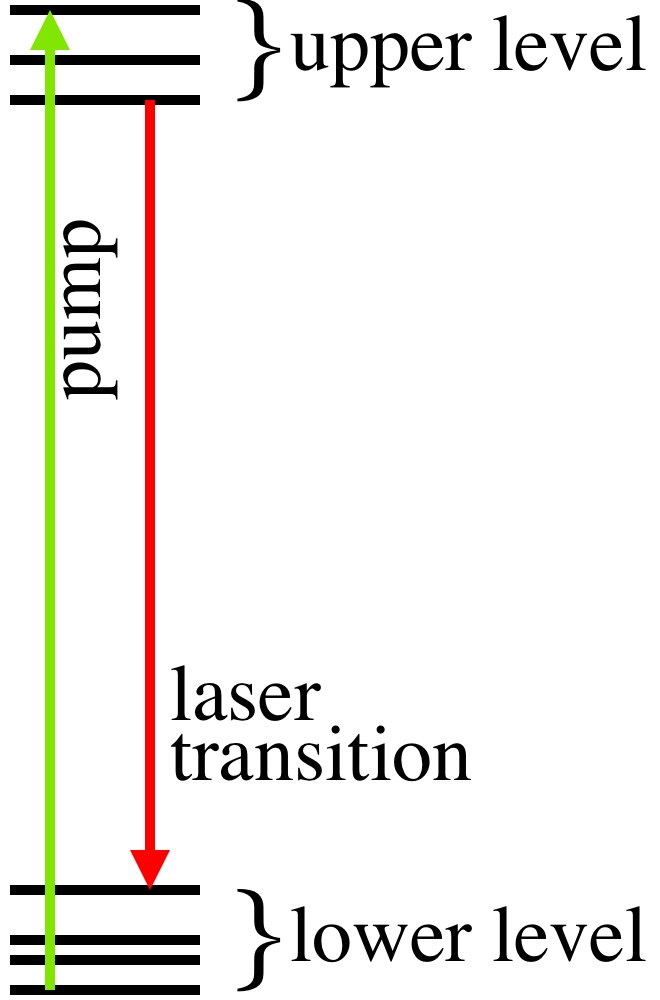
Simplified scheme of levels in a gain medium

The simplest model of optical gain in real systems includes just two, energetically well separated, groups of sub-levels. Within each sub-level group, fast transitions ensure that thermal equilibrium is reached quickly. Stimulated emissions between upper and lower groups, essential for gain, require the upper levels to be more populated than the corresponding lower ones. This situation is called population-inversion. It is more readily achieved if unstimulated transition rates between the two groups are slow, i.e. the upper levels are metastable. Population inversions are more easily produced when only the lowest sublevels are occupied, requiring either low temperatures or well energetically split groups.

In the case of amplification of optical signals, the lasing frequency is called signal frequency. If the externally provided energy required for the signal's amplification is optical, it would necessarily be at the same or higher pump frequency.

=== Cross-sections ===
The simple medium can be characterized with effective cross-sections of absorption and emission at frequencies ω_{p} and ω_{s}.

- Have N be concentration of active centers in the solid-state lasers.
- Have N_{1} be concentration of active centers in the ground state.
- Have N_{2} be concentration of excited centers.
- Have N_{1} + N_{2} = N.

The relative concentrations can be defined as

$$n_1 = \frac{N_1}{N}, \quad n_2 = \frac{N_2}{N}.$$

The rate of transitions of an active center from the ground state to the excited state can be expressed as

$$W_{\rm u} = \frac{I_{\rm p}\sigma_{\rm ap}}{ \hbar \omega_{\rm p} } + \frac{I_{\rm s}\sigma_{\rm as}}{ \hbar \omega_{\rm s} },$$

while the rate of transitions back to the ground state can be expressed as

$$W_{\rm d} = \frac{ I_{\rm p} \sigma_{\rm ep}}{ \hbar \omega_{\rm p} } + \frac{I_{\rm s}\sigma_{\rm es}}{ \hbar \omega_{\rm s} } +\frac{1}{\tau},$$

where

σ_{as} and σ_{ap} are effective cross-sections of absorption at the frequencies of the signal and the pump;
σ_{es} and σ_{ep} are the same for stimulated emission;
$\tfrac{1}{\tau}$ is rate of the spontaneous decay of the upper level.

Then, the kinetic equation for relative populations can be written as follows:

$$\begin{align}
\frac{{\rm d}n_2}{{\rm d}t} &= W_{\rm u}n_1 - W_{\rm d}n_2 \\[2pt]
\frac{{\rm d}n_1}{{\rm d}t} &= -W_{\rm u}n_1 + W_{\rm d}n_2
\end{align}$$

However, these equations keep n_{1} + n_{2} = 1.

The absorption A at the pump frequency and the gain G at the signal frequency can be written as follows:

$$\begin{align}
A &= N_1\sigma_{\rm pa} -N_2\sigma_{\rm pe}, \\[4pt]
G &= N_2\sigma_{\rm se} -N_1\sigma_{\rm sa}.
\end{align}$$

=== Steady-state solution ===
In many cases the gain medium works in a continuous-wave or quasi-continuous regime, causing the time derivatives of populations to be negligible.

The steady-state solution can be written:

$$n_2 = \frac{W_{\rm u}}{W_{\rm u} + W_{\rm d}}, \quad
n_1 = \frac{W_{\rm d}}{W_{\rm u} + W_{\rm d}}.$$

The dynamic saturation intensities can be defined:

$$I_{\rm po} = \frac{\hbar \omega_{\rm p}}{(\sigma_{\rm ap} + \sigma_{\rm ep})\tau} , \quad
I_{\rm so} = \frac{\hbar \omega_{\rm s}}{(\sigma_{\rm as} + \sigma_{\rm es})\tau} .$$

The absorption at strong signal:

$$A_0 = \frac{ND}{\sigma_{\rm as} + \sigma_{\rm es}}.$$

The gain at strong pump:

$$G_0 = \frac{ND}{\sigma_{\rm ap} + \sigma_{\rm ep}},$$

where D = σ_{pa}σ_{se} – σ_{pe}σ_{sa} is determinant of cross-section.

Gain never exceeds value G_{0}, and absorption never exceeds value A_{0}U.

At given intensities I_{p}, I_{s} of pump and signal, the gain and absorption can be expressed as follows:
$$A = A_0 \frac{U + s}{1 + p + s}, \quad
G = G_0 \frac{p - V}{1 + p + s},$$
where
$$\begin{align}
p &= \frac{I_{\rm p}}{I_{\rm po}}, \quad s = \frac{I_{\rm s}}{I_{\rm so}}, \\[4pt]
U &= \frac{(\sigma_{\rm as}+\sigma_{\rm es})\sigma_{\rm ap}}{D}, \\[4pt]
V &= \frac{(\sigma_{\rm ap}+\sigma_{\rm ep})\sigma_{\rm as}}{D}.
\end{align}$$

=== Identities ===
The following identities take place:
$$U - V = 1, \quad \frac{A}{A_0} + \frac{G}{G_0} = 1.$$
The state of gain medium can be characterized with a single parameter, such as population of the upper level, gain or absorption.

=== Efficiency of the gain medium ===
The efficiency E of a gain medium can be defined as
$$E =\frac{I_{\rm s} G}{I_{\rm p}A}.~$$

Within the same model, the efficiency can be expressed as follows:
$$E = \frac{\omega_{\rm s}}{\omega_{\rm p}} \times \frac{1 - \frac{V}{p}}{1 + \frac{U}{s}}.$$

For efficient operation, both intensities—pump and signal—should exceed their saturation intensities:
$$\frac{p}{V}\gg 1, \quad \frac{s}{U}\gg 1.$$

The estimates above are valid for a medium uniformly filled with pump and signal light. Spatial hole burning may slightly reduce the efficiency because some regions are pumped well, but the pump is not efficiently withdrawn by the signal in the nodes of the interference of counter-propagating waves.

== See also ==
- Population inversion
- Laser construction
- Laser science
- List of laser articles
- List of laser types
