= List of semiconductor scale examples =

Listed are many semiconductor scale examples for various metal–oxide–semiconductor field-effect transistor (MOSFET, or MOS transistor) semiconductor manufacturing process nodes.

== Timeline of MOSFET demonstrations ==
=== PMOS and NMOS ===
MOSFET (PMOS and NMOS) demonstrations
Date	Channel length	Oxide thickness	MOSFET logic	Researcher(s)	Organization	Ref
June 1960	20,000 nm	100 nm	PMOS	Mohamed M. Atalla, Dawon Kahng	Bell Telephone Laboratories	
June 1960	20,000 nm	100 nm	NMOS	Mohamed M. Atalla, Dawon Kahng	Bell Telephone Laboratories	
June 1960	10,000 nm	100 nm	PMOS	Mohamed M. Atalla, Dawon Kahng	Bell Telephone Laboratories	
June 1960	10,000 nm	100 nm	NMOS	Mohamed M. Atalla, Dawon Kahng	Bell Telephone Laboratories	
May 1965	8,000 nm	150 nm	NMOS	Chih-Tang Sah, Otto Leistiko, A.S. Grove	Fairchild Semiconductor	
May 1965	5,000 nm	170 nm	PMOS	Chih-Tang Sah, Otto Leistiko, A.S. Grove	Fairchild Semiconductor	
December 1972	1,000 nm	?	PMOS	Robert H. Dennard, Fritz H. Gaensslen, Hwa-Nien Yu	IBM T.J. Watson Research Center	
1973	7,500 nm	?	NMOS	Sohichi Suzuki	NEC	
1973	6,000 nm	?	PMOS	?	Toshiba	
October 1974	1,000 nm	35 nm	NMOS	Robert H. Dennard, Fritz H. Gaensslen, Hwa-Nien Yu	IBM T.J. Watson Research Center	
October 1974	500 nm	35 nm	NMOS	Robert H. Dennard, Fritz H. Gaensslen, Hwa-Nien Yu	IBM T.J. Watson Research Center	
September 1975	1,500 nm	20 nm	NMOS	Ryoichi Hori, Hiroo Masuda, Osamu Minato	Hitachi	
March 1976	3,000 nm	?	NMOS	?	Intel	
April 1979	1,000 nm	25 nm	NMOS	William R. Hunter, L. M. Ephrath, Alice Cramer	IBM T.J. Watson Research Center	
December 1984	100 nm	5 nm	NMOS	Toshio Kobayashi, Seiji Horiguchi, K. Kiuchi	Nippon Telegraph and Telephone	
December 1985	150 nm	2.5 nm	NMOS	Toshio Kobayashi, Seiji Horiguchi, M. Miyake, M. Oda	Nippon Telegraph and Telephone	
December 1985	75 nm	?	NMOS	Stephen Y. Chou, Henry I. Smith, Dimitri A. Antoniadis	MIT	
January 1986	60 nm	?	NMOS	Stephen Y. Chou, Henry I. Smith, Dimitri A. Antoniadis	MIT	
June 1987	200 nm	3.5 nm	PMOS	Toshio Kobayashi, M. Miyake, K. Deguchi	Nippon Telegraph and Telephone	
December 1993	40 nm	?	NMOS	Mizuki Ono, Masanobu Saito, Takashi Yoshitomi	Toshiba	
September 1996	16 nm	?	PMOS	Hisao Kawaura, Toshitsugu Sakamoto, Toshio Baba	NEC	
June 1998	50 nm	1.3 nm	NMOS	Khaled Z. Ahmed, Effiong E. Ibok, Miryeong Song	Advanced Micro Devices (AMD)	
December 2002	6 nm	?	PMOS	Bruce Doris, Omer Dokumaci, Meikei Ieong	IBM	
December 2003	3 nm	?	PMOS	Hitoshi Wakabayashi, Shigeharu Yamagami	NEC	
December 2003	3 nm	?	NMOS	Hitoshi Wakabayashi, Shigeharu Yamagami	NEC	

=== CMOS (single-gate) ===
Complementary MOSFET (CMOS) demonstrations (single-gate)
Date	Channel length	Oxide thickness	Researcher(s)	Organization	Ref
February 1963	?	?	Chih-Tang Sah, Frank Wanlass	Fairchild Semiconductor	
1968	20,000 nm	100 nm	?	RCA Laboratories	
1970	10,000 nm	100 nm	?	RCA Laboratories	
December 1976	2,000 nm	?	A. Aitken, R.G. Poulsen, A.T.P. MacArthur, J.J. White	Mitel Semiconductor	
February 1978	3,000 nm	?	Toshiaki Masuhara, Osamu Minato, Toshio Sasaki, Yoshio Sakai	Hitachi Central Research Laboratory	
February 1983	1,200 nm	25 nm	R.J.C. Chwang, M. Choi, D. Creek, S. Stern, P.H. Pelley	Intel	
February 1983	900 nm	15 nm	Tsuneo Mano, J. Yamada, Junichi Inoue, S. Nakajima	Nippon Telegraph and Telephone (NTT)	
December 1983	1,000 nm	22.5 nm	G.J. Hu, Yuan Taur, Robert H. Dennard, Chung-Yu Ting	IBM T.J. Watson Research Center	
February 1987	800 nm	17 nm	T. Sumi, Tsuneo Taniguchi, Mikio Kishimoto, Hiroshige Hirano	Matsushita	
February 1987	700 nm	12 nm	Tsuneo Mano, J. Yamada, Junichi Inoue, S. Nakajima	Nippon Telegraph and Telephone (NTT)	
September 1987	500 nm	12.5 nm	Hussein I. Hanafi, Robert H. Dennard, Yuan Taur, Nadim F. Haddad	IBM T.J. Watson Research Center	
December 1987	250 nm	?	Naoki Kasai, Nobuhiro Endo, Hiroshi Kitajima	NEC	
February 1988	400 nm	10 nm	M. Inoue, H. Kotani, T. Yamada, Hiroyuki Yamauchi	Matsushita	
December 1990	100 nm	?	Ghavam G. Shahidi, Bijan Davari, Yuan Taur, James D. Warnock	IBM T.J. Watson Research Center	
1993	350 nm	?	?	Sony	
1996	150 nm	?	?	Mitsubishi Electric	
1998	180 nm	?	?	TSMC	
December 2003	5 nm	?	Hitoshi Wakabayashi, Shigeharu Yamagami, Nobuyuki Ikezawa	NEC	

=== Multi-gate MOSFET (MuGFET) ===
Multi-gate MOSFET (MuGFET) demonstrations
Date	Channel length	MuGFET type	Researcher(s)	Organization	Ref
August 1984	?	DGMOS	Toshihiro Sekigawa, Yutaka Hayashi	Electrotechnical Laboratory (ETL)	
1987	2,000 nm	DGMOS	Toshihiro Sekigawa	Electrotechnical Laboratory (ETL)	
December 1988	250 nm	DGMOS	Bijan Davari, Wen-Hsing Chang, Matthew R. Wordeman, C.S. Oh	IBM T.J. Watson Research Center	
December 1988	180 nm	DGMOS	Bijan Davari, Wen-Hsing Chang, Matthew R. Wordeman, C.S. Oh	IBM T.J. Watson Research Center	
December 1988	?	GAAFET	Fujio Masuoka, Hiroshi Takato, Kazumasa Sunouchi, N. Okabe	Toshiba	
December 1989	200 nm	FinFET	Digh Hisamoto, Toru Kaga, Yoshifumi Kawamoto, Eiji Takeda	Hitachi Central Research Laboratory	
December 1998	17 nm	FinFET	Digh Hisamoto, Chenming Hu, Tsu-Jae King Liu, Jeffrey Bokor	University of California (Berkeley)	
2001	15 nm	FinFET	Chenming Hu, Yang-Kyu Choi, Nick Lindert, Tsu-Jae King Liu	University of California (Berkeley)	
December 2002	10 nm	FinFET	Shibly Ahmed, Scott Bell, Cyrus Tabery, Jeffrey Bokor	University of California (Berkeley)	
June 2006	3 nm	GAAFET	Hyunjin Lee, Yang-kyu Choi, Lee-Eun Yu, Seong-Wan Ryu	KAIST	

=== Other types of MOSFET ===
MOSFET demonstrations (other types)
Date	Channel length (nm)	Oxide thickness (nm)	MOSFET type	Researcher(s)	Organization	Ref
October 1962	?	?	TFT	Paul K. Weimer	RCA Laboratories	
1965	?	?	GaAs	H. Becke, R. Hall, J. White	RCA Laboratories	
October 1966	100,000	100	TFT	T.P. Brody, H.E. Kunig	Westinghouse Electric	
August 1967	?	?	FGMOS	Dawon Kahng, Simon Min Sze	Bell Telephone Laboratories	
October 1967	?	?	MNOS	H.A. Richard Wegener, A.J. Lincoln, H.C. Pao	Sperry Corporation	
July 1968	?	?	BiMOS	Hung-Chang Lin, Ramachandra R. Iyer	Westinghouse Electric	
October 1968	?	?	BiCMOS	Hung-Chang Lin, Ramachandra R. Iyer, C.T. Ho	Westinghouse Electric	
1969	?	?	VMOS	?	Hitachi	
September 1969	?	?	DMOS	Y. Tarui, Y. Hayashi, Toshihiro Sekigawa	Electrotechnical Laboratory (ETL)	
October 1970	?	?	ISFET	Piet Bergveld	University of Twente	
October 1970	1000	?	DMOS	Y. Tarui, Y. Hayashi, Toshihiro Sekigawa	Electrotechnical Laboratory (ETL)	
1977	?	?	VDMOS	John Louis Moll	HP Labs	
1977	?	?	LDMOS	?	Hitachi	
July 1979	?	?	IGBT	Bantval Jayant Baliga, Margaret Lazeri	General Electric	
December 1984	2000	?	BiCMOS	H. Higuchi, Goro Kitsukawa, Takahide Ikeda, Y. Nishio	Hitachi	
May 1985	300	?	?	K. Deguchi, Kazuhiko Komatsu, M. Miyake, H. Namatsu	Nippon Telegraph and Telephone	
February 1985	1000	?	BiCMOS	H. Momose, Hideki Shibata, S. Saitoh, Jun-ichi Miyamoto	Toshiba	
November 1986	90	8.3	?	Han-Sheng Lee, L.C. Puzio	General Motors	
December 1986	60	?	?	Ghavam G. Shahidi, Dimitri A. Antoniadis, Henry I. Smith	MIT	
May 1987	?	10	?	Bijan Davari, Chung-Yu Ting, Kie Y. Ahn, S. Basavaiah	IBM T.J. Watson Research Center	
December 1987	800	?	BiCMOS	Robert H. Havemann, R. E. Eklund, Hiep V. Tran	Texas Instruments	
June 1997	30	?	EJ-MOSFET	Hisao Kawaura, Toshitsugu Sakamoto, Toshio Baba	NEC	
1998	32	?	?	?	NEC	
1999	8	?	?	?	NEC	
April 2000	8	?	EJ-MOSFET	Hisao Kawaura, Toshitsugu Sakamoto, Toshio Baba	NEC	

== Commercial products using micro-scale MOSFETs ==
=== Products featuring 20 μm manufacturing process ===
- RCA's CD4000 series of integrated circuits (ICs) beginning in 1968.

=== Products featuring 10 μm manufacturing process ===
- Intel 4004, the first single-chip microprocessor CPU, launched in 1971.
- Intel 8008 CPU launched in 1972.

=== Products featuring 8 μm manufacturing process ===
- Intel 1103, an early dynamic random-access memory (DRAM) chip launched in 1970.
- MOS Technology 6502 1 MHz CPU launched in 1975.

=== Products featuring 6 μm manufacturing process ===
- Toshiba TLCS-12, a microprocessor developed for the Ford EEC (Electronic Engine Control) system in 1973.
- Intel 8080 CPU launched in 1974 was manufactured using this process.
- The Television Interface Adaptor, the custom graphics and audio chip developed for the Atari 2600 in 1977.
- MOS Technology SID, a programmable sound generator developed for the Commodore 64 in 1982.
- MOS Technology VIC-II, a video display controller developed for the Commodore 64 in 1982 (5 μm).

=== Products featuring 3 μm manufacturing process ===
- Intel 8085 CPU launched in 1976.
- Intel 8086 CPU launched in 1978.
- Intel 8088 CPU launched in 1979.
- Motorola 68000 8 MHz CPU launched in 1979 (3.5 μm).

=== Products featuring 1.5 μm manufacturing process ===
- NEC's 64 kb SRAM memory chip in 1981.
- Intel 80286 CPU launched in 1982.
- The Amiga Advanced Graphics Architecture (initially sold in 1992) included chips such as Alice that were manufactured using a 1.5 μm CMOS process.

=== Products featuring 1 μm manufacturing process ===
- NTT's DRAM memory chips, including its 64 kb chip in 1979 and 256 kb chip in 1980.
- NEC's 1 Mb DRAM memory chip in 1984.
- Intel 80386 CPU launched in 1985.

=== Products featuring 800 nm manufacturing process ===
- NTT's 1 Mb DRAM memory chip in 1984.
- NEC and Toshiba used this process for their 4 Mb DRAM memory chips in 1986.
- Hitachi, IBM, Matsushita and Mitsubishi Electric used this process for their 4 Mb DRAM memory chips in 1987.
- Toshiba's 4 Mb EPROM memory chip in 1987.
- Hitachi, Mitsubishi and Toshiba used this process for their 1 Mb SRAM memory chips in 1987.
- Intel 486 CPU launched in 1989.
- microSPARC I launched in 1992.
- First Intel P5 Pentium CPUs at 60 MHz and 66 MHz launched in 1993.

=== Products featuring 600 nm manufacturing process ===
- Mitsubishi Electric, Toshiba and NEC introduced 16 Mb DRAM memory chips manufactured with a 600 nm process in 1989.
- NEC's 16 Mb EPROM memory chip in 1990.
- Mitsubishi's 16 Mb flash memory chip in 1991.
- Intel 80486DX4 CPU launched in 1994.
- IBM/Motorola PowerPC 601, the first PowerPC chip, was produced in 0.6 μm.
- Intel Pentium CPUs at 75 MHz, 90 MHz and 100 MHz.

=== Products featuring 350 nm manufacturing process ===
- Sony's 16 Mb SRAM memory chip in 1994.
- NEC VR4300 (1995), used in the Nintendo 64 game console.
- Intel Pentium Pro (1995), Pentium (P54CS, 1995), and initial Pentium II CPUs (Klamath, 1997).
- AMD K5 (1996) and original AMD K6 (Model 6, 1997) CPUs.
- Parallax Propeller, 8 core microcontroller.

=== Products featuring 250 nm manufacturing process ===
- Hitachi's 16 Mb SRAM memory chip in 1993.
- Hitachi and NEC introduced 256 Mb DRAM memory chips manufactured with this process in 1993, followed by Matsushita, Mitsubishi Electric and Oki in 1994.
- NEC's 1 Gb DRAM memory chip in 1995.
- Hitachi's 128 Mb NAND flash memory chip in 1996.
- DEC Alpha 21264A, which was made commercially available in 1999.
- AMD K6-2 Chomper and Chomper Extended. Chomper was released on May 28, 1998.
- AMD K6-III "Sharptooth" used 250 nm.
- Mobile Pentium MMX Tillamook, released in August 1997.
- Pentium II Deschutes.
- Dreamcast console's Hitachi SH-4 CPU and PowerVR2 GPU, released in 1998.
- Pentium III Katmai.
- Initial PlayStation 2's Emotion Engine CPU.

=== Processors using 180 nm manufacturing technology ===
- Intel Coppermine E- October 1999
- Sony PlayStation 2 console's Emotion Engine and Graphics Synthesizer – March 2000
- ATI Radeon R100 and RV100 Radeon 7000 – 2000
- AMD Athlon Thunderbird – June 2000
- Intel Celeron (Willamette) – May 2002
- Motorola PowerPC 7445 and 7455 (Apollo 6) – January 2002

=== Processors using 130 nm manufacturing technology ===
- Fujitsu SPARC64 V – 2001
- Gekko by IBM and Nintendo (GameCube console) – 2001
- Motorola PowerPC 7447 and 7457 – 2002
- IBM PowerPC G5 970 – October 2002 – June 2003
- Intel Pentium III Tualatin and Coppermine – 2001-04
- Intel Celeron Tualatin-256 – 2001-10-02
- Intel Pentium M Banias – 2003-03-12
- Intel Pentium 4 Northwood- 2002-01-07
- Intel Celeron Northwood-128 – 2002-09-18
- Intel Xeon Prestonia and Gallatin – 2002-02-25
- VIA C3 – 2001
- AMD Athlon XP Thoroughbred, Thorton, and Barton
- AMD Athlon MP Thoroughbred – 2002-08-27
- AMD Athlon XP-M Thoroughbred, Barton, and Dublin
- AMD Duron Applebred – 2003-08-21
- AMD K7 Sempron Thoroughbred-B, Thorton, and Barton – 2004-07-28
- AMD K8 Sempron Paris – 2004-07-28
- AMD Athlon 64 Clawhammer and Newcastle – 2003-09-23
- AMD Opteron Sledgehammer – 2003-06-30
- Elbrus 2000 1891ВМ4Я (1891VM4YA) – 2008-04-27
- MCST-R500S 1891BM3 – 2008-07-27
- Vortex 86SX –

== Commercial products using nano-scale MOSFETs ==
=== Chips using 90 nm manufacturing technology ===
- Sony–Toshiba Emotion Engine+Graphics Synthesizer (PlayStation 2) – 2003
- IBM PowerPC G5 970FX – 2004
- Elpida Memory's 90 nm DDR2 SDRAM process – 2005
- IBM PowerPC G5 970MP – 2005
- IBM PowerPC G5 970GX – 2005
- IBM Waternoose Xbox 360 Processor – 2005
- IBM–Sony–Toshiba Cell processor – 2005
- Intel Pentium 4 Prescott – 2004-02
- Intel Celeron D Prescott-256 – 2004-05
- Intel Pentium M Dothan – 2004-05
- Intel Celeron M Dothan-1024 – 2004-08
- Intel Xeon Nocona, Irwindale, Cranford, Potomac, Paxville – 2004-06
- Intel Pentium D Smithfield – 2005-05
- AMD Athlon 64 Winchester, Venice, San Diego, Orleans – 2004-10
- AMD Athlon 64 X2 Manchester, Toledo, Windsor – 2005-05
- AMD Sempron Palermo and Manila – 2004-08
- AMD Turion 64 Lancaster and Richmond – 2005-03
- AMD Turion 64 X2 Taylor and Trinidad – 2006-05
- AMD Opteron Venus, Troy, and Athens – 2005-08
- AMD Dual-core Opteron Denmark, Italy, Egypt, Santa Ana, and Santa Rosa
- VIA C7 – 2005-05
- Loongson (Godson) 2Е STLS2E02 – 2007-04
- Loongson (Godson) 2F STLS2F02 – 2008-07
- MCST-4R – 2010-12
- Elbrus-2C+ – 2011-11

=== Processors using 65 nm manufacturing technology ===
- Sony–Toshiba EE+GS (PStwo) – 2005
- Intel Pentium 4 (Cedar Mill) – 2006-01-16
- Intel Pentium D 900-series – 2006-01-16
- Intel Celeron D (Cedar Mill cores) – 2006-05-28
- Intel Core – 2006-01-05
- Intel Core 2 – 2006-07-27
- Intel Xeon (Sossaman) – 2006-03-14
- AMD Athlon 64 series (starting from Lima) – 2007-02-20
- AMD Turion 64 X2 series (starting from Tyler) – 2007-05-07
- AMD Phenom series
- IBM's Cell Processor – PlayStation 3 – 2007-11-17
- IBM's z10
- Microsoft Xbox 360 "Falcon" CPU – 2007–09
- Microsoft Xbox 360 "Opus" CPU – 2008
- Microsoft Xbox 360 "Jasper" CPU – 2008–10
- Microsoft Xbox 360 "Jasper" GPU – 2008–10
- Sun UltraSPARC T2 – 2007–10
- AMD Turion Ultra – 2008-06
- TI OMAP 3 Family – 2008-02
- VIA Nano – 2008-05
- Loongson – 2009
- NVIDIA GeForce 8800GT GPU – 2007

=== Processors using 45 nm technology ===
- Matsushita released the 45 nm Uniphier in 2007.
- Wolfdale, Yorkfield, Yorkfield XE and Penryn are Intel cores sold under the Core 2 brand.
- Intel Core i7 series processors, i5 750 (Lynnfield and Clarksfield)
- Pentium Dual-Core Wolfdale-3M are current Intel mainstream dual core sold under the Pentium brand.
- Diamondville, Pineview are current Intel cores with hyper-threading sold under the Intel Atom brand.
- AMD Deneb (Phenom II) and Shanghai (Opteron) Quad-Core Processors, Regor (Athlon II) dual core processors , Caspian (Turion II) mobile dual core processors.
- AMD (Phenom II) "Thuban" Six-Core Processor (1055T)
- Xenon in the Xbox 360 S model.
- Sony–Toshiba Cell Broadband Engine in PlayStation 3 Slim model – September 2009.
- Samsung S5PC110, as known as Hummingbird.
- Texas Instruments OMAP 36xx.
- IBM POWER7 and z196
- Fujitsu SPARC64 VIIIfx series
- Espresso (microprocessor) Wii U CPU

=== Chips using 32 nm technology ===
- Toshiba produced commercial 32 Gb NAND flash memory chips with the 32 nm process in 2009.
- Intel Core i3 and i5 processors, released in January 2010
- Intel 6-core processor, codenamed Gulftown
- Intel i7-970, was released in late July 2010, priced at approximately US$900
- AMD FX Series processors, codenamed Zambezi and based on AMD's Bulldozer architecture, were released in October 2011. The technology used a 32 nm SOI process, two CPU cores per module, and up to four modules, ranging from a quad-core design costing approximately US$130 to a $280 eight-core design.
- Ambarella Inc. announced the availability of the A7L system-on-a-chip circuit for digital still cameras, providing 1080p60 high-definition video capabilities in September 2011

=== Chips using 24–28 nm technology ===
- SK Hynix announced that it could produce a 26 nm flash chip with 64 Gb capacity; Intel Corp. and Micron Technology had by then already developed the technology themselves. Announced in 2010.
- Toshiba announced that it was shipping 24 nm flash memory NAND devices on August 31, 2010.
- In 2016 MCST's 28 nm processor Elbrus-8S went for serial production.
- AMD's A Series and many later Athlon X4 chips based on Steamroller & Excavator were largely based on the 28 nm process node.

=== Chips using 22 nm technology ===
- Intel Core i7 and Intel Core i5 processors based on Intel's Ivy Bridge 22 nm technology for series 7 chip-sets went on sale worldwide on April 23, 2012.

=== Chips using 20 nm technology ===
- Samsung Electronics began mass production of 64 Gb NAND flash memory chips using a 20 nm process in 2010.
- Nvidia Tegra X1 (Nintendo Switch and Nvidia Shield TV)

=== Chips using 16 nm technology ===
- TSMC first began 16 nm FinFET chip production in 2013.
- Nvidia Tegra X1+ (later Nintendo Switch and Nvidia Shield TV models)

=== Chips using 14 nm technology ===
- Intel Core i7 and Intel Core i5 processors based on Intel's Broadwell 14 nm technology was launched in January 2015.
- AMD Ryzen processors based on AMD's Zen or Zen+ architectures and which uses 14 nm FinFET technology.

=== Chips using 10 nm technology ===
- Samsung announced that it had begun mass production of multi-level cell (MLC) flash memory chips using a 10 nm process in 2013. On 17 October 2016, Samsung Electronics announced mass production of SoC chips at 10 nm.
- TSMC began commercial production of 10 nm chips in early 2016, before moving onto mass production in early 2017.
- Samsung began shipping Galaxy S8 smartphone in April 2017 using the company's 10 nm processor.
- Apple delivered second-generation iPad Pro tablets powered with TSMC-produced Apple A10X chips using the 10 nm FinFET process in June 2017.

=== Chips using 7 nm technology ===
- TSMC began risk production of 256 Mbit SRAM memory chips using a 7 nm process in April 2017.
- Samsung and TSMC began mass production of 7 nm devices in 2018.
- Apple A12 and Huawei Kirin 980 mobile processors, both released in 2018, use 7 nm chips manufactured by TSMC.
- AMD began using TSMC 7 nm starting with the Vega 20 GPU in November 2018, with Zen 2-based CPUs and APUs from July 2019, and for both PlayStation 5 and Xbox Series X/S consoles' APUs, released both in November 2020.

=== Chips using 5 nm technology ===
- Samsung began production of 5 nm chips (5LPE) in late 2018.
- TSMC began production of 5 nm chips (CLN5FF) in April 2019.

=== Chips using 3 nm technology ===
- TSMC have announced plans to release 3 nm devices during 2021–2022.
- Samsung Electronics have begun risk production of 3 nm GAAFET transistors in June 2022.
- Apple A17 Pro (iPhone 15 Pro)

=== Chips using 2 nm technology ===
- Apple Apple A20 Pro (iPhone 18 Pro)

== See also ==
- Foundry model
- MOSFET
- Semiconductor device fabrication
- Transistor count
- List of semiconductor materials
- Semiconductor characterization techniques
