= Die shrink =

Process of scaling down the size of semiconductor devices

The term die shrink (sometimes optical shrink or process shrink) refers to the scaling of metal–oxide–semiconductor (MOS) devices. The act of shrinking a die creates a somewhat identical circuit using a more advanced fabrication process, usually involving an advance of lithographic nodes. This reduces overall costs for a chip company, as the absence of major architectural changes to the processor lowers research and development costs while at the same time allowing more processor dies to be manufactured on the same piece of silicon wafer, resulting in less cost per product sold.

Die shrinks are the key to lower prices and higher performance at semiconductor companies such as Samsung, Intel, TSMC, and SK Hynix, and fabless manufacturers such as AMD (including the former ATI), NVIDIA and MediaTek.

== Details ==
Examples in the 2000s include the downscaling of the PlayStation 2's Emotion Engine processor from Sony and Toshiba (from 180 nm CMOS in 2000 to 90 nm CMOS in 2003), the codenamed Cedar Mill Pentium 4 processors (from 90 nm CMOS to 65 nm CMOS) and Penryn Core 2 processors (from 65 nm CMOS to 45 nm CMOS), the codenamed Brisbane Athlon 64 X2 processors (from 90 nm SOI to 65 nm SOI), various generations of GPUs from both ATI and NVIDIA, and various generations of RAM and flash memory chips from Samsung, Toshiba and SK Hynix. In January 2010, Intel released Clarkdale Core i5 and Core i7 processors fabricated with a 32 nm process, down from a previous 45 nm process used in older iterations of the Nehalem processor microarchitecture. Intel, in particular, formerly focused on leveraging die shrinks to improve product performance at a regular cadence through its Tick–Tock model. In this business model, every new microarchitecture (tock) is followed by a die shrink (tick) to improve performance with the same microarchitecture.

Die shrinks are beneficial to end-users as shrinking a die reduces the current used by each transistor switching on or off in semiconductor devices while maintaining the same clock frequency of a chip, making a product with less power consumption (and thus less heat production), increased clock rate headroom, and lower prices. Since the cost to fabricate a 200-mm or 300-mm silicon wafer is proportional to the number of fabrication steps and not proportional to the number of chips on the wafer, die shrinks cram more chips onto each wafer, resulting in lowered manufacturing costs per chip.

== Half-shrink ==
In CPU fabrication, a die shrink always involves an advance to a lithographic node as defined by ITRS (see list). For GPU and SoC manufacturing, the die shrink often involves shrinking the die on a node not defined by the ITRS, for instance, the 150 nm, 110 nm, 80 nm, 55 nm, 20 nm and more currently 4 nm nodes, sometimes referred to as "half-nodes". This is a stopgap between two ITRS-defined lithographic nodes (thus called a "half-node shrink") before further shrink to the lower ITRS-defined nodes occurs, which helps save additional R&D cost. The choice to perform die shrinks to either full nodes or half-nodes rests with the foundry and not the integrated circuit designer.

Half-shrink
Main ITRS node	Stopgap half-node
250 nm	220 nm
180 nm	150 nm
130 nm	110 nm
90 nm	80 nm
65 nm	55 nm
45 nm	40 nm
32 nm	28 nm
22 nm	20 nm
14 nm	12 nm
10 nm	8 nm
7 nm	6 nm
5 nm	4 nm
3 nm	—N/a

== See also ==
- Integrated circuit
- Semiconductor device fabrication
- Photolithography
- Moore's law
- Transistor count
