= 10 nm =

10nm or 10 nm may refer to:

- 10 nm process, a level of MOSFET semiconductor process technology
- 10 nm, an order of magnitude of length
