= Ghavam Shahidi =

Ghavam G. Shahidi (born 1959) is an Iranian-American electrical engineer and IBM Fellow. He is the director of Silicon Technology at the IBM Thomas J Watson Research Center. He is best known for his pioneering work in silicon-on-insulator (SOI) complementary metal–oxide–semiconductor (CMOS) technology since the late 1980s.

== Career ==
He studied electrical engineering at MIT, where he wrote a PhD thesis on "velocity overshoot in deeply scaled MOSFETs" (metal–oxide–semiconductor field-effect transistors), under supervision of Professor Dimitri A. Antoniadis.

A 60 nanometer silicon MOSFET (metal–oxide–semiconductor field-effect transistor) was fabricated by Shahidi with Antoniadis and Henry I. Smith at MIT in 1986. The device was fabricated using X-ray lithography.

Shahidi joined IBM Research in 1989, where he initiated and subsequently led the development of silicon-on-insulator (SOI) complementary metal–oxide–semiconductor (CMOS) technology at IBM. It was called the SOI Research Program, which he led at the IBM Thomas J Watson Research Center. Since then, he was the chief architect of SOI technology at IBM, leading the development of high-performance CMOS and SOI technologies at IBM Microelectronics. He made fundamental contributions to SOI technology, from materials research to the development of the first commercially viable devices. He was supported by his boss Bijan Davari, who believed in the technology and supported Shahidi's team.

He was a key figure in making SOI CMOS technology a manufacturable reality and enabling the continued miniaturization of microelectronics. Early SOI technology had a number of problems with manufacturing, modeling, circuits, and reliability, and it was not clear that it could offer performance gains over established technologies. In the early 1990s, he demonstrated a novel technique of combining silicon epitaxial overgrowth and chemical mechanical polishing to prepare device-quality SOI material for fabricating devices and simple circuits, which led to IBM expanding its research program to include SOI substrates. He was also the first to demonstrate the power-delay advantage of SOI CMOS technology over traditional bulk CMOS in microprocessor applications. He overcame barriers preventing the semiconductor industry's adoption of SOI, and was instrumental in driving SOI substrate development to the quality and cost levels suitable for mass-production.

This led to the first commercial use of SOI in mainstream CMOS technology. SOI was first commercialized in 1995, when Shahidi's work on SOI convinced John Kelly, who ran IBM's server division, to adopt SOI in the AS/400 line of server products, which used 220 nm CMOS with copper metallization SOI devices. In early 2001, he used SOI to developed a low-power RF CMOS device, resulting in increased radio frequency. Later that year, IBM was set to introduce 130 nanometer CMOS SOI devices with copper and low-κ dielectric for the back end, based on Shahidi's work.

His work resulted in the qualification of multiple CMOS SOI technologies and their transfer to manufacturing; establishment of design infrastructure; and the first mainstream use of SOI. He remained with IBM Microelectronics as the director of high-performance logic development until 2003. He then moved back to IBM's Watson's Laboratory as the Director of Silicon Technology.

As director of silicon technology at IBM Research, he was researching lithography technology in the early 2000s. In 2004, he announced plans for IBM to commercialize lithography based on light filtered through water, and then X-ray lithography within the next several years. He also announced that his team were investigating 20 new semiconductor materials.

Shahidi received the Institute of Electrical and Electronics Engineers' J J Ebers Award in 2006, for his "contributions and leadership in the development of Silicon-On-Insulator CMOS technology". He is currently the director of Silicon Technology at the IBM Thomas J Watson Research Center in Yorktown Heights, New York.
