= 1 μm =

1μm and 1 μm may refer to:

- 1 μm process, a level of MOSFET semiconductor process technology
- 1 μm, an order of magnitude of length
