= 22 nm process =

Process in semiconductor device fabrication

The 22 nm node is the process step following 32 nm in CMOS MOSFET semiconductor device fabrication. It was first demonstrated by semiconductor companies for use in RAM in 2008. In 2010, Toshiba began shipping 24 nm flash memory chips, and Samsung Electronics began mass-producing 20 nm flash memory chips. The first consumer-level CPU deliveries using a 22 nm process started in April 2012 with the Intel Ivy Bridge processors.

Since at least 1997, process nodes have been named purely on a marketing basis, and have no relation to the dimensions on the integrated circuit; none of the gate length, metal pitch or gate pitch on a "22 nm" device are twenty-two nanometers.

The ITRS 2006 Front End Process Update indicates that equivalent physical oxide thickness will not scale below 0.5 nm (about twice the diameter of a silicon atom), which is the expected value at the 22 nm node. This is an indication that CMOS scaling in this area has reached a wall at this point, possibly disturbing Moore's law.

The 20-nanometre node is an intermediate half-node die shrink based on the 22-nanometre process.

TSMC began mass production of 20 nm nodes in 2014. The 22 nm process was superseded by commercial 14 nm FinFET technology in 2014.

== Technology demos ==
On August 18, 2008, AMD, Freescale, IBM, STMicroelectronics, Toshiba, and the College of Nanoscale Science and Engineering (CNSE) announced that they jointly developed and manufactured a 22 nm SRAM cell, built on a traditional six-transistor design on a 300 mm wafer, which had a memory cell size of just 0.1 μm^{2}. The cell was printed using immersion lithography.

The 22 nm node may be the first time where the gate length is not necessarily smaller than the technology node designation. For example, a 25 nm gate length would be typical for the 22 nm node.

On September 22, 2009, during the Intel Developer Forum Fall 2009, Intel showed a 22 nm wafer and announced that chips with 22 nm technology would be available in the second half of 2011. SRAM cell size is said to be 0.092 μm^{2}, smallest reported to date.

On January 3, 2010, Intel and Micron Technology announced the first in a family of 25 nm NAND devices.

On May 2, 2011, Intel announced its first 22 nm microprocessor, codenamed Ivy Bridge, using a FinFET technology called 3-D tri-gate.

IBM's POWER8 processors are produced in a 22 nm SOI process.

== Shipped devices ==
- Toshiba announced that it was shipping 24 nm flash memory NAND devices on August 31, 2010.
- In 2010, Samsung Electronics began mass production of 64 Gbit NAND flash memory chips using a 20 nm process.
- Also in 2010, Hynix introduced a 64 Gbit NAND flash memory chip using a 20 nm process.
- On April 23, 2012, Intel Core i7 and Intel Core i5 processors based on Intel's Ivy Bridge 22 nm technology for series 7 chipsets went on sale worldwide. Volume production of 22 nm processors began more than six months earlier, as confirmed by former Intel CEO Paul Otellini on October 19, 2011.
- On June 3, 2013, Intel started shipping Intel Core i7 and Intel Core i5 processors based on Intel's Haswell microarchitecture in 22 nm tri-gate FinFET technology for series 8 chipsets. Intel's 22nm process has a transistor density of 16.5 million transistors per square millimeter (MTr/mm2).

Preceded by 32 nm (CMOS)	22 nm (FinFET) c. 2012-2014	Succeeded by 14 nm
