= CHMOS =

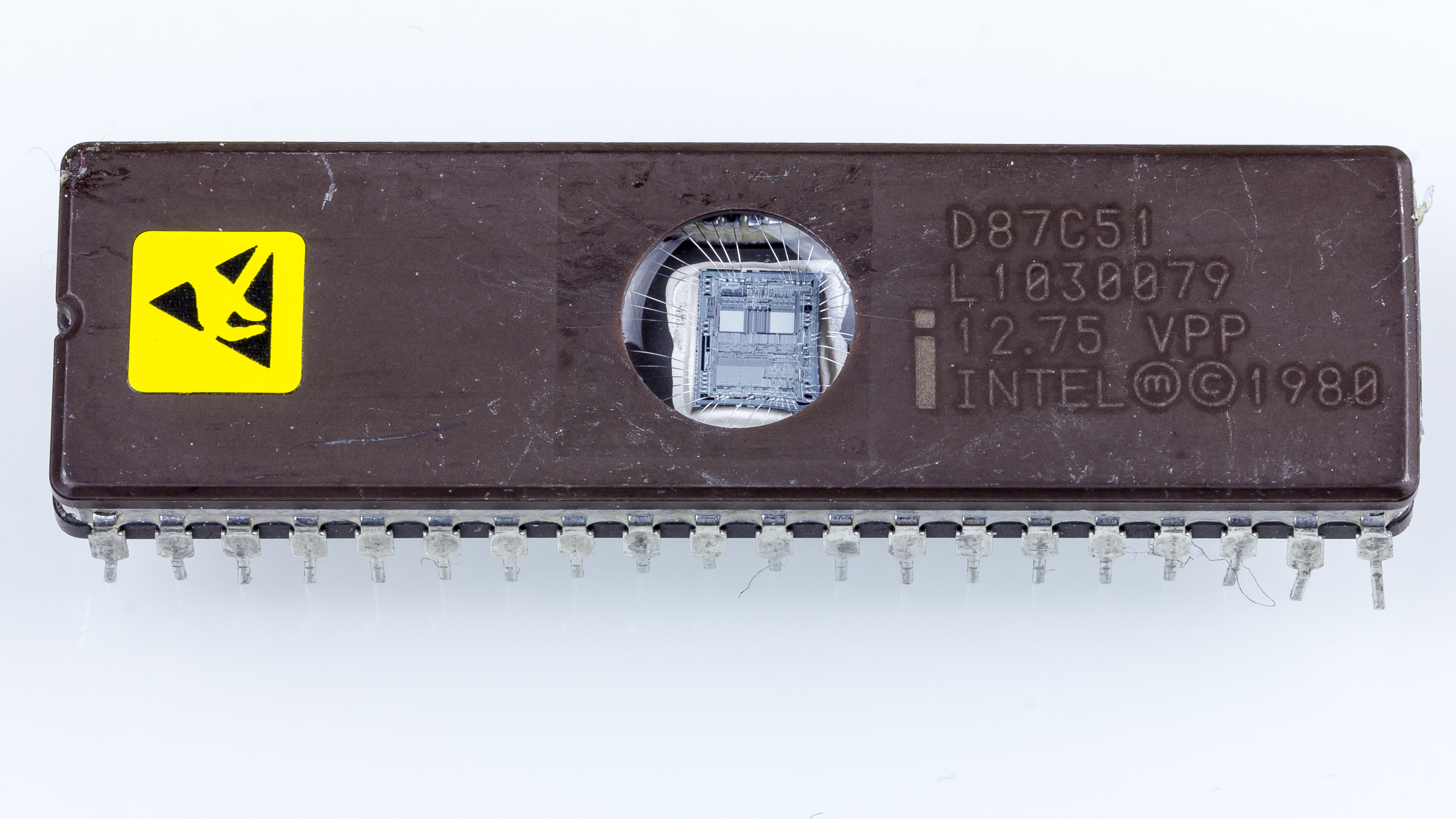
Intel D87C51. Fabricated on Intel's CHMOS III-E technology. A member of the MCS-51 controller family

CHMOS refers to one of a series of Intel CMOS processes developed from their HMOS process. CHMOS stands for "complementary high-performance metal-oxide-silicon. It was first developed in 1981.

CHMOS was used in the Intel 80C51BH, a new version of their standard MCS-51 microcontroller. The chip was also used in later versions of Intel 8086, and the 80C88, which were fully static version of the Intel 8088. The Intel 80386 was made in 1.5 μm CHMOS III, and later in 1.0 μm CHMOS IV.

CHMOS III used 1.5 micron lithography, p-well processing, n-well processing, and two layers of metal.

CHMOS III-E was used for the 12.5 MHz Intel 80C186 microprocessor. This technology uses 1 μm process for the EPROM.

CHMOS IV (H stands for High Speed) used 1.0 μm lithography. Many versions of the Intel 80486 were made in 1.0 μm CHMOS IV. Intel uses this technology on these 80C186EB and 80C188EB embedded processors.

CHMOS V used 0.8 μm lithography and 3 metal layers, and was used in later versions of the 80386, 80486, Intel486 SL and i860.

== See also ==
- Depletion-load NMOS logic#Further development
