= 800 nm process =

Semiconductor manufacturing processes with a 800 nm MOSFET technology node

The 800 nm process (800 nanometer process) is a level of semiconductor process technology that was reached in the 1987–1990 timeframe, by companies, such as Intel, ATI Technologies, and IBM.

The 800 nm process refers to the minimum size that could be reliably produced. The smallest transistors and other circuit elements on a chip made with this process were around 800 nanometers wide.

== Products featuring 800 nm manufacturing process ==
- 50-MHz i486DX CPU launched in 1991 was manufactured using this process.
- Both 25/50 and 33/66 MHz Intel486 DX2 CPU using this process.
- Early version of Intel486 SX2 using this process.
- Intel uses this ETOX-III (EPROM Tunnel Oxide) process technology for these Flash Memory modules.
- The 3.3-volt 25 MHz version of Intel486 SL uses this three-layer CHMOS V process.
- microSPARC I launched in 1992
- First Intel P5 Pentium CPUs at 60 MHz and 66 MHz launched in 1993 using BiCMOS technology process.

Preceded by 1 µm	CMOS manufacturing processes	Succeeded by 600 nm
