= 1 μm process =

Semiconductor manufacturing process

The 1 μm process (1 micrometer process) is a level of MOSFET semiconductor process technology that was commercialized around the 1984–1986 timeframe, by companies like NTT, NEC, Intel and IBM. It was the first process where CMOS was common (as opposed to NMOS).

The 1 μm process refers to the minimum size that could be reliably produced. The smallest transistors and other circuit elements on a chip made with this process were around 1 micrometer wide.

The earliest MOSFET with a 1 μm NMOS channel length was fabricated by a research team led by Robert H. Dennard, Hwa-Nien Yu and F.H. Gaensslen at the IBM T.J. Watson Research Center in 1974.

== Products featuring 1.0 μm manufacturing process ==
- NTT introduced the 1 μm process for its DRAM memory chips, including its 64k in 1979 and 256k in 1980.
- NEC's 1 Mbit DRAM memory chip was manufactured with the 1 μm process in 1984.
- Intel 80386 CPU launched in 1985 was manufactured using this process.
- Intel uses this process on the CHMOS III-E technology.
- Intel uses this process on the CHMOS IV technology.

Preceded by 1.5 μm process	MOSFET semiconductor device fabrication process	Succeeded by 800 nm process
