= 3 μm process =

Semiconductor manufacturing processes

The 3 μm process (3 micrometer process) is the level of MOSFET semiconductor process technology that was reached around 1977, by companies such as Intel.

The 3 μm process refers to the minimum size that could be reliably produced. The smallest transistors and other circuit elements on a chip made with this process were around 3 micrometers wide.

== Products featuring 3 μm manufacturing process ==
- Intel's 8085 CPU, launched in 1976 was manufactured using its 3 μm NMOS (HMOS) process..
- Intel 8086 CPU, launched in 1978, had a 3.2 μm minimum feature size.
- Hitachi's 4 kbit HM6147 SRAM memory chip, launched in 1978, introduced the twin-well CMOS process, at 3 μm.
- Motorola 68000 (MC68000) CPU, launched in 1979, was originally fabricated using an HMOS process with a 3.5 μm feature size.
- The ARM1 was launched in 1985 and manufactured on a 3 μm process.

| Preceded by 6 μm process | MOSFET semiconductor device fabrication process | Succeeded by 1.5 μm process |
