= Fin field-effect transistor =

Type of non-planar transistor

- 3D architectural diagram of a double-gate FinFET device, showing the vertical silicon fin wrapped by the gate to control current flow between the source and drain.
- Component type: Multigate device / MOSFET / Semiconductor device
- Working principle: Electric field modulation of a 3D channel
- Inventor: Digh Hisamoto (1989) and Chenming Hu (1999)
- Invention year: 1999
- First produced: 2011 (Commercialized by Intel under the "Tri-Gate" trade name)
- Pin names: 3 or 4 terminals: Source, Gate, Drain, and occasionally Body

Electronic symbol
- Standard schematic FET symbols are commonly adapted for multi-gate representations

A fin field-effect transistor (FinFET) is a multigate device, a MOSFET (metal–oxide–semiconductor field-effect transistor) built on a substrate where the gate is placed on two, three, or four sides of the channel or wrapped around the channel (gate all around), forming a double or even multi gate structure. These devices have been given the generic name "FinFETs" because the source/drain region forms fins on the silicon surface. The FinFET devices exhibit significantly faster switching times and higher current density than planar CMOS (complementary metal–oxide–semiconductor) technology, resulting in enhanced performance and power efficiency.

FinFET is a type of non-planar transistor, or "3D" transistor. It is the basis for modern nanoelectronic semiconductor device fabrication. Microchips utilizing FinFET gates first became commercialized in the first half of the 2010s, and became the dominant gate design at 14 nm, 10 nm and 7 nm process nodes.

It is common for a single FinFET transistor to contain several fins, arranged side by side and all covered by the same gate, that act electrically as one. The number of fins can be varied to adjust drive strength and performance, with drive strength increasing with a higher number of fins.

== History ==
The concept of a double-gate thin-film transistor (TFT) was proposed by H. R. Farrah (Bendix Corporation) and R. F. Steinberg in 1967. A double-gate MOSFET was later proposed by Toshihiro Sekigawa of the Electrotechnical Laboratory (ETL) in a 1980 patent describing the planar XMOS transistor. Sekigawa fabricated the XMOS transistor with Yutaka Hayashi at the ETL in 1984. They demonstrated that short-channel effects can be significantly reduced by sandwiching a fully depleted silicon-on-insulator (SOI) device between two gate electrodes connected together.

The first FinFET transistor type was called a depleted lean-channel transistor (DELTA) transistor, which was first fabricated in Japan by Hitachi Central Research Laboratory's Digh Hisamoto, Toru Kaga, Yoshifumi Kawamoto and Eiji Takeda in 1989. The gate of the transistor can cover and electrically contact the semiconductor channel fin on both the top and the sides or only on the sides. The former is called a tri-gate transistor and the latter a double-gate transistor. A double-gate transistor optionally can have each side connected to two different terminal or contacts. This variant is called split transistor, enabling more refined control of the operation of the transistor.

Indonesian engineer Effendi Leobandung, while working at the University of Minnesota, published a paper with Stephen Y. Chou at the 54th Device Research Conference in 1996 outlining the benefit of cutting a wide CMOS transistor into many channels with narrow width to improve device scaling and increase device current by increasing the effective device width. This structure is what a modern FinFET looks like. Although some device width is sacrificed by cutting it into narrow widths, the conduction of the side wall of narrow fins more than make up for the loss, for tall fins. The device had a 35 nm channel width and 70 nm channel length.

Defense Advanced Research Projects Agency (DARPA), in 1997 awarded a contract to a research group at the University of California, Berkeley to develop a practical 3D sub-micron FinFET technology. The group was led by Hisamoto along with TSMC's Chenming Hu. The team made the following breakthroughs between 1998 and 2004. Digh Hisamoto requested to be a visiting researcher in Chenming Hu's Berkeley research group. Chenming Hu invited Hisamoto to join the DARPA funded FinFET project.

- 1998 – N-channel FinFET (17 nm) – Digh Hisamoto, Chenming Hu, Tsu-Jae King Liu, Jeffrey Bokor, Wen-Chin Lee, Jakub Kedzierski, Erik Anderson, Hideki Takeuchi, Kazuya Asano
- 1999 – P-channel FinFET (sub-50 nm) – Digh Hisamoto, Chenming Hu, Xuejue Huang, Wen-Chin Lee, Charles Kuo, Leland Chang, Jakub Kedzierski, Erik Anderson, Hideki Takeuchi
- 2001 – 15 nm FinFET – Chenming Hu, Yang-Kyu Choi, Nick Lindert, P. Xuan, S. Tang, D. Ha, Erik Anderson, Tsu-Jae King Liu, Jeffrey Bokor
- 2002 – 10 nm FinFET – Shibly Ahmed, Scott Bell, Cyrus Tabery, Jeffrey Bokor, David Kyser, Chenming Hu, Tsu-Jae King Liu, Bin Yu, Leland Chang
- 2004 – High-κ/metal gate FinFET – D. Ha, Hideki Takeuchi, Yang-Kyu Choi, Tsu-Jae King Liu, W. Bai, D.-L. Kwong, A. Agarwal, M. Ameen

They coined the term "FinFET" (fin field-effect transistor) in a December 2000 paper, used to describe a non-planar, double-gate transistor built on an SOI substrate.

In 2006, a team of Korean researchers from the Korea Advanced Institute of Science and Technology (KAIST) and the National Nano Fab Center developed a 3 nm transistor, the world's smallest nanoelectronic device, based on gate-all-around (GAA) FinFET technology. In 2011, Rice University researchers Masoud Rostami and Kartik Mohanram demonstrated that FinFETs can have two electrically independent gates, which gives circuit designers more flexibility to design with efficient, low-power gates.

In 2020, Chenming Hu received the IEEE Medal of Honor award for his development of the FinFET, which the Institute of Electrical and Electronics Engineers (IEEE) credited with taking transistors to the third dimension and extending Moore's law.

== Commercialization ==
The industry's first 25 nanometer transistor operating on just 0.7 volts was demonstrated in December 2002 by TSMC. The "Omega FinFET" design, named after the similarity between the Greek letter "Omega" and the shape in which the gate wraps around the source/drain structure, has a gate delay of just 0.39 picosecond (ps) for the N-type transistor and 0.88 ps for the P-type.

In 2004, Samsung demonstrated a "bulk FinFET" design, which made it possible to mass-produce FinFET devices. They demonstrated dynamic random-access memory (DRAM) manufactured with a 90 nm bulk FinFET process.

In 2011, Intel demonstrated tri-gate transistors, where the gate surrounds the channel on three sides, allowing for increased energy efficiency and lower gate delay—and thus greater performance—over planar transistors.

Commercially produced chips at 22 nm and below have generally utilised FinFET gate designs (but planar processes do exist down to 18 nm, with 12 nm in development). Intel's tri-gate variant were announced at 22 nm in 2011 for its Ivy Bridge microarchitecture. These devices shipped from 2012 onwards. From 2014 onwards, at 14 nm (or 16 nm) major foundries (TSMC, Samsung, GlobalFoundries) utilised FinFET designs.

In 2013, SK Hynix began commercial mass-production of a 16 nm process, TSMC began production of a 16 nm FinFET process, and Samsung Electronics began production of a 10 nm process. TSMC began production of a 7 nm process in 2017, and Samsung began production of a 5 nm process in 2018. In 2019, Samsung announced plans for the commercial production of a 3 nm GAAFET process by 2021. FD-SOI (fully depleted silicon on insulator) has been seen as a potential low cost alternative to FinFETs.

Commercial production of nanoelectronic FinFET semiconductor memory began in the 2010s. In 2013, SK Hynix began mass-production of 16 nm NAND flash memory, and Samsung Electronics began production of 10 nm multi-level cell (MLC) NAND flash memory. In 2017, TSMC began production of SRAM memory using a 7 nm process.

== See also ==
- Transistor count
