= 1.5 μm process =

Semiconductor manufacturing process

The 1.5 μm process (1.5 micrometer process) is the level of MOSFET semiconductor process technology that was reached around 1981–1982, by companies such as Intel and IBM.

The 1.5 μm process refers to the minimum size that could be reliably produced. The smallest transistors and other circuit elements on a chip made with this process were around 1.5 micrometers wide.

== Products featuring 1.5 μm manufacturing process ==
- NEC's 64 kbit SRAM memory chip introduced the 1.5 μm process in 1981.
- Intel 80286 CPU launched in 1982 was manufactured using this process.
- Intel introduced a 64 kbit DRAM memory chip using a 1.5 μm CMOS process in 1983.
- Ricoh RF5C164 is a 1.5 μm silicon-gate CMOS sound chip used in the Sega CD video game console, released in 1991.
- The Amiga Advanced Graphics Architecture (initially sold in 1992) included chips such as Lisa that were manufactured using a 1.5 μm CMOS process.
- Intel used the 1.5-micron process on the HMOS-III technology.
- Intel used the 1.4-micron process on the HMOS II-E technology.
- Intel used the 1.5-micron process on the CHMOS III technology.

Preceded by 3 μm process	MOSFET semiconductor device fabrication process	Succeeded by 1 μm process
