= Tsu-Jae King Liu =

American electrical engineer

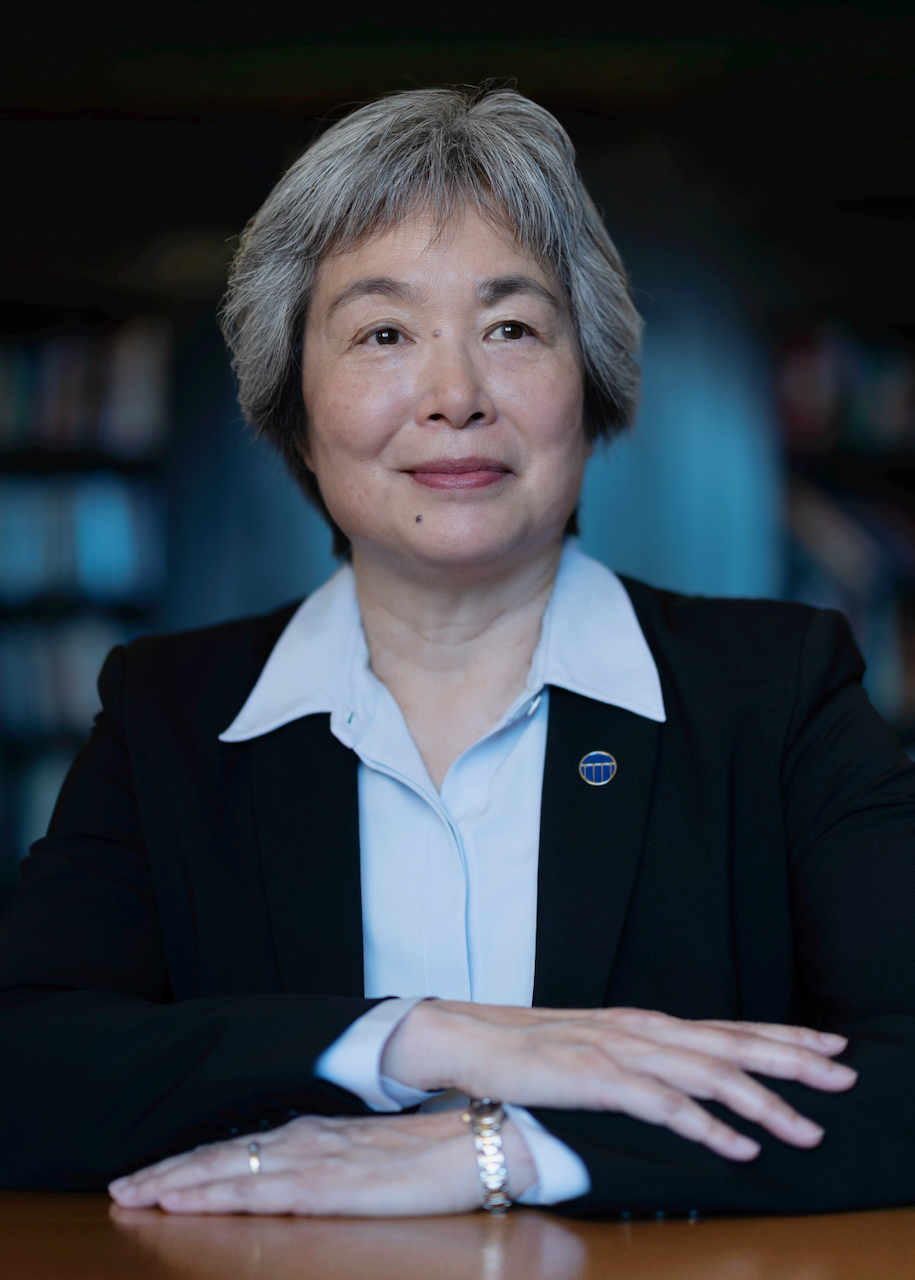
- Liu in 2026

President of the National Academy of Engineering
- Incumbent
- Assumed office July 1, 2025

Dean of the UC Berkeley College of Engineering
- In office June 2018 – June 2025

Personal details
- Born: June 4, 1963 (age 63) Ithaca, New York, U.S.
- Education: Stanford University (BS, MS, PhD)

Tsu-Jae King Liu (Chinese: 劉金智潔, born June 4, 1963) is an American academic and electrical engineer who serves as the current president of the National Academy of Engineering. Liu formerly served as the dean of the UC Berkeley College of Engineering, where she also held the Roy W. Carlson Professor of Engineering.

At the University of California, Berkeley, Liu leads a research team that explores the development of novel semiconductor devices, non-volatile memory devices, and M/NEMS technology for ultra-low power circuits. Her team is a part of the Berkeley Emerging Technologies Research Center and the NSF Center for Energy Efficient Electronics in Science. She is also a faculty member of the Kavli Energy NanoScience Institute at Berkeley and an affiliate faculty member of Berkeley's Applied Science & Technology Graduate Program and the Nanoscale Science and Engineering Graduate Group.

== Early life and education ==
Liu was born in Ithaca, New York, to Taiwanese American parents who were graduate students at Cornell University. Her father's research was in the area of earthquake prediction and, as such, she spent the majority of her childhood in the San Francisco Bay Area.

As a high-school student, Liu was given a tour of the PARC campus, where her interest in computing was stimulated by a demonstration of the Xerox Alto. She earned a Bachelor of Science (B.S.), a Master of Science (M.S.), and a Ph.D. in electrical engineering from Stanford University in 1984, 1986, and 1994, respectively.

== Career ==
After graduating from Stanford, Liu joined the research staff at the Xerox Palo Alto Research Center (PARC). Her time at PARC from 1992 to 1996 was distinguished by her work on polycrystalline thin-film transistors. In August 1996, Liu joined Berkeley as a faculty member of the Electrical Engineering and Computer Science Department. Liu has contributed to many developments in the field of semiconductor devices and technology and has co-authored over 500 papers.

Liu's leading contributions span many research areas but she is perhaps best known for the development of polycrystalline silicon-germanium thin film technology for applications in integrated circuits and microsystems. Liu is also the co-inventor of the three-dimensional FinFET transistor (fin field-effect transistor) which is the design that is used in all leading microprocessor chips today. Liu was elected to the National Academy of Engineering in 2017 "for contributions to the fin field effect transistor (FinFET) and its application to nanometer complementary metal–oxide–semiconductor (CMOS) technology".

She holds over 94 patents in the area of semiconductor devices and fabrication methods, with 80 patents pending as of 2017, 37 of which had been assigned to a company she founded, Progressant Technologies, acquired by Synopsys in 2004.

In her role as dean of Berkeley's College of Engineering, Liu has been outspoken about her commitment to increase diversity and foster inclusion and respect for women and members of underrepresented minorities in engineering. Prior to assuming her role as dean, Liu had served in extensive leadership roles at Berkeley. She was the faculty director of the Marvell Nanofabrication Laboratory. From 2008 to 2012, she was associate dean for research in the College of Engineering. She served as chair of the Electrical Engineering Division from 2012 to 2014 and as chair of the Electrical Engineering and Computer Science Department from 2014 to 2016.

She was previously senior director of engineering in the Advanced Technology Group of Synopsys.

From 2016 to 2025, Liu served as a member of the board of directors of Intel.

In 2024 she received the IEEE Founders Medal.

In September 2024, she was nominated to be next National Academy of Engineering President. Her election was formally announced in May 2025 with her term as President starting on July 1, 2025.

In October 2026 she was awarded the title of Doctor honoris causa by EPFL.

== Research and select publications ==
A full list of Liu's publications are available online. This is a list are of her most cited works:

- Hisamoto, D.; Wen-Chin Lee; Kedzierski, J.; Takeuchi, H.; Asano, K.; Kuo, C.; Anderson, E.; Tsu-Jae King; Bokor, J. (2000). "FinFET-a self-aligned double-gate MOSFET scalable to 20 nm". IEEE Transactions on Electron Devices. 47 (12): 2320–2325. Bibcode:2000ITED...47.2320H. doi:10.1109/16.887014. ISSN 0018-9383.
- Choi, W. Y.; Park, B.; Lee, J. D.; Liu, T. K. (2007). "Tunneling Field-Effect Transistors (TFETs) With Subthreshold Swing (SS) Less Than 60 mV/dec". IEEE Electron Device Letters. 28 (8): 743–745. Bibcode:2007IEDL...28..743C. doi:10.1109/LED.2007.901273. ISSN 0741-3106. S2CID 8811022.
- Huang, Chong-Cheng; Tsai, Wen-Ta; Lee, Ju-Tung (February 1996). "Surface modification of carbon steel with laser treated nitrogen-containing stainless steel layers". Surface and Coatings Technology. 79 (1–3): 67–70. doi:10.1016/0257-8972(95)02438-7.
- Bin Yu; Leland Chang; Ahmed, S.; Haihong Wang; Bell, S.; Chih-Yuh Yang; Tabery, C.; Chau Ho; Qi Xiang (2002). "FinFET scaling to 10 nm gate length". Digest. International Electron Devices Meeting. pp. 251–254. CiteSeerX 10.1.1.136.3757. doi:10.1109/IEDM.2002.1175825. ISBN 0-7803-7462-2. S2CID 7106946.
- Xuejue Huang; Wen-Chin Lee; Kuo, C.; Hisamoto, D.; Leland Chang; Kedzierski, J.; Anderson, E.; Takeuchi, H.; Yang-Kyu Choi (2001). "Sub-50 nm P-channel FinFET". IEEE Transactions on Electron Devices. 48 (5): 880–886. Bibcode:2001ITED...48..880H. doi:10.1109/16.918235. ISSN 0018-9383.
- Yeo, Yee-Chia; King, Tsu-Jae; Hu, Chenming (2002-11-27). "Metal-dielectric band alignment and its implications for metal gate complementary metal–oxide–semiconductor technology". Journal of Applied Physics. 92 (12): 7266–7271. Bibcode:2002JAP....92.7266Y. doi:10.1063/1.1521517. ISSN 0021-8979.
- Yang-Kyu Choi; Lindert, N.; Peiqi Xuan; Tang, S.; Daewon Ha; Anderson, E.; Tsu-Jae King; Bokor, J.; Chenming Hu (2001). "Sub-20 nm CMOS FinFET technologies". International Electron Devices Meeting. Technical Digest (Cat. No.01CH37224). pp. 19.1.1–19.1.4. doi:10.1109/IEDM.2001.979526. ISBN 0-7803-7050-3. S2CID 8908553.
- Yu Cao; Groves, R. A.; Zamdmer, N. D.; Plouchart, J.-; Wachnik, R. A.; Xuejue Huang; King, T.-; Chenming Hu (2002). "Frequency-independent equivalent circuit model for on-chip spiral inductors". Proceedings of the IEEE 2002 Custom Integrated Circuits Conference (Cat. No.02CH37285). pp. 217–220. doi:10.1109/CICC.2002.1012800. ISBN 0-7803-7250-6. S2CID 6065522.

== Awards ==
Liu has received numerous accolades for her research contributions:

- Elected Member, National Academy of Inventors (2018)
- Elected Member, National Academy of Engineering (2017)
- Fellow, Institute of Electrical and Electronics Engineers
- DARPA Significant Technical Achievement Award, for her work on FinFET (2000)
- IEEE Kiyo Tomiyasu Award, for her contributions to nanoscale MOS transistors (2010)
- Outstanding Research Award, Semiconductor Industry Association (2014)
- Inductee, Silicon Valley Hall of Fame
- Outstanding Researcher in Nanotechnology Award, Intel (2012)
- SIA University Researcher Award (2012)
- Asia Society's Game Changer West Award (2021)
- Doctor honoris causa, EPFL (2026)

She has also been recognized for her contributions to teaching and mentorship as a faculty member:

- Outstanding Teaching Award, Electrical Engineering
- Distinguished Faculty Mentoring Award, UC Berkeley
- Aristotle Award, Semiconductor Research Corporation
