= Jeffrey Bokor =

American electrical engineer

Jeffrey Bokor is an American electrical engineer.

Bokor earned a bachelor's degree in electrical engineering from the Massachusetts Institute of Technology in 1975 and completed a doctorate in the same field at Stanford University in 1980. He then worked for AT&T Bell Laboratories until joining the faculty of the University of California, Berkeley in 1993. At Berkeley, Bokor was the National Semiconductor Distinguished Professor of Engineering, and accepted a later appointment as Paul R. Gray Distinguished Professor of Engineering. He served as the Electrical Engineering and Computer Sciences department chair between July 2019 and July 2021, after which he was succeeded by Claire Tomlin. Bokor is also affiliated with the Materials Science Division of the Lawrence Berkeley National Laboratory as a senior scientist.

Bokor was elected a fellow of the American Physical Society in 1998, which recognized him "[f]or contributions to laser science, including short-wavelength lasers and non-linear optics, development of time-resolved, two-photon photoemission, and contributions to extreme ultraviolet lithography and sub-micron MOSFET device development." The IEEE awarded him an equivalent honor in 2000, acknowledging Bokor "[f]or contributions to EUV optical lithography and deep-submicron MOSFETs."
