= 250 nm process =

Semiconductor manufacturing processes

The 250 nm process (250 nanometer process or 0.25 μm process) is a level of semiconductor process technology that was reached by most manufacturers in the 1997–1998 timeframe.

== Products featuring 250 nm manufacturing process ==
- The DEC Alpha 21264A, which was made commercially available in 1999.
- The AMD K6-2 Chomper and Chomper Extended. Chomper was released on May 28, 1998.
- The AMD K6-III "Sharptooth" used 250 nm.
- The mobile Pentium MMX Tillamook, released in August 1997.
- The Pentium II Deschutes.
- The Pentium III Katmai.
- The Dreamcast's CPU and GPU.
- The initial version of the Emotion Engine processor used in the PlayStation 2.

Preceded by 350 nm	CMOS manufacturing processes	Succeeded by 180 nm
