= Transistor count =

Number of transistors in a device

The transistor count is the number of transistors in an electronic device (typically on a single substrate or silicon die). It is the most common measure of integrated circuit complexity (although the majority of transistors in modern microprocessors are contained in cache memories, which consist mostly of the same memory cell circuits replicated many times). The rate at which MOS transistor counts have increased generally follows Moore's law, which observes that transistor count doubles approximately every two years. However, being directly proportional to the area of a die, transistor count does not represent how advanced the corresponding manufacturing technology is. A better indication of this is transistor density which is the ratio of a device's transistor count to its die area.

== Records ==
As of 2023, the highest transistor count in flash memory is Micron's 2 terabyte (3D-stacked) 16-die, 232-layer V-NAND flash memory chip, with 5.3 trillion floating-gate MOSFETs (3 bits per transistor).

The highest transistor count in a single chip processor as of 2020 is that of the deep learning processor Wafer Scale Engine 2 by Cerebras. It has 2.6 trillion MOSFETs in 84 exposed fields (dies) on a wafer, manufactured using TSMC's 7 nm FinFET process.

As of 2026, the GPU with the highest transistor count is Nvidia's Rubin accelerator, built on TSMC's custom N3P process node and totaling 336 billion MOSFETs.

The highest transistor count in a consumer microprocessor as of March 2025 is 184 billion transistors, in Apple's ARM-based dual-die M3 Ultra SoC, which is fabricated using TSMC's 3 nm semiconductor manufacturing process.

Year	Component	Name	Number of MOSFETs (billion)	Remarks
2022	Flash memory	Micron's V-NAND module	5300	stacked package of sixteen 232-layer 3D NAND dies
2020	any processor	Wafer Scale Engine 2	2600	wafer-scale design of 84 exposed fields (dies)
2026	GPU	Nvidia Rubin	336	Uses two reticle limit dies and two I/O dies, joined and acting as a single large monolithic piece of silicon
2025	Microprocessor (consumer)	Apple M3 Ultra	184	SoC using two dies joined with a high-speed bridge

In terms of computer systems that consist of numerous integrated circuits, the supercomputer with the highest transistor count as of 2016 was the Chinese-designed Sunway TaihuLight, which has for all CPUs/nodes combined "about 400 trillion transistors in the processing part of the hardware" and "the DRAM includes about 12 quadrillion transistors, and that's about 97 percent of all the transistors." To compare, the smallest computer, as of 2018 dwarfed by a grain of rice, had on the order of 100,000 transistors. Early experimental solid-state computers had as few as 130 transistors but used large amounts of diode logic. The first carbon nanotube computer had 178 transistors and was a 1-bit one-instruction set computer, while a later one is 16-bit (its instruction set is 32-bit RISC-V though).

Ionic transistor chips ("water-based" analog limited processor), have up to hundreds of such transistors.

Estimates of the total numbers of transistors manufactured:

- Up to 2014: 2.9×10^{21}
- Up to 2018: 1.3×10^{22}

== Transistor count ==
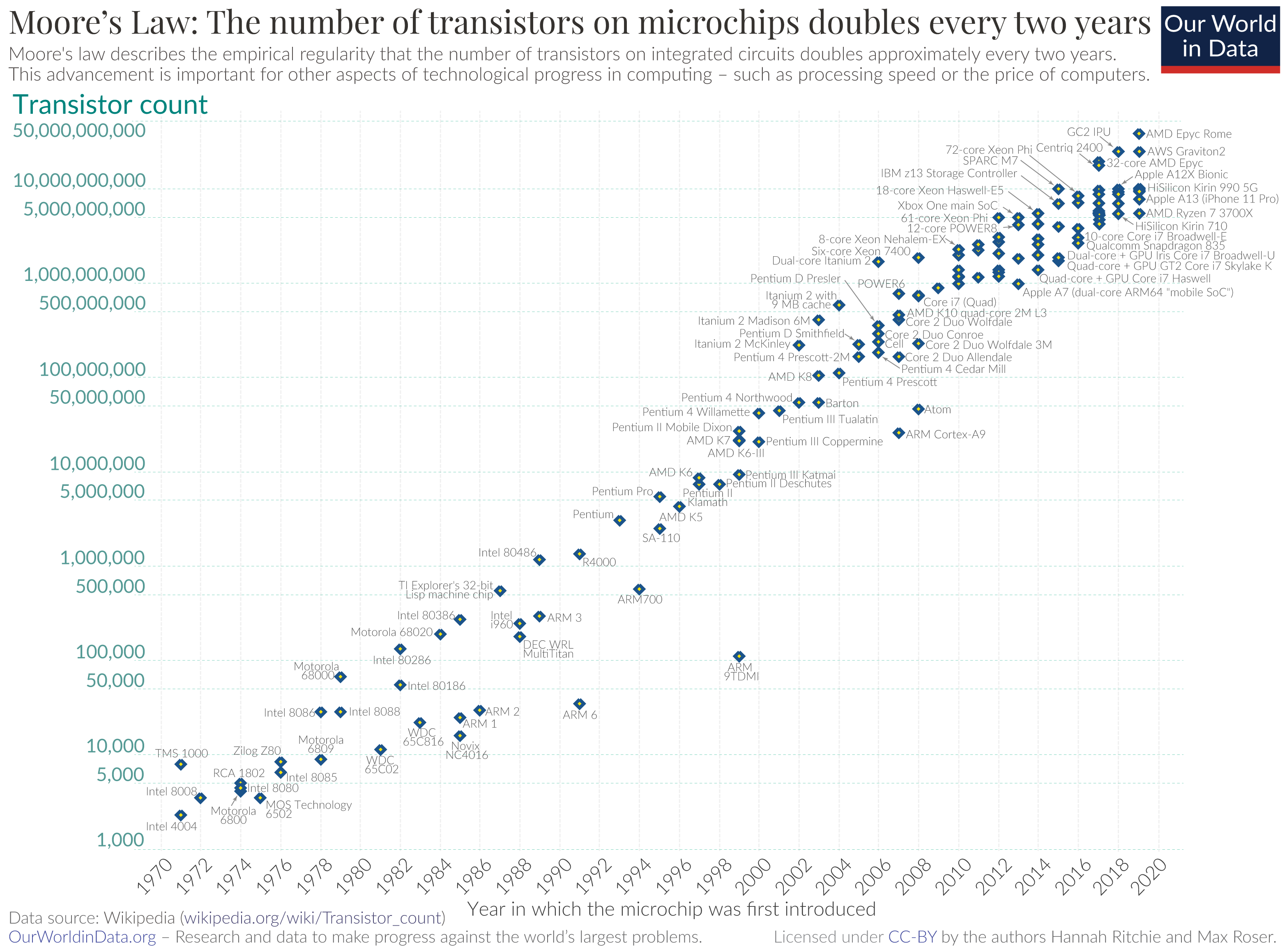
Plot of MOS transistor counts for microprocessors against dates of introduction. The curve shows counts doubling every two years, per Moore's law.

=== Microprocessors ===
A microprocessor incorporates the functions of a computer's central processing unit on a single integrated circuit. It is a multi-purpose, programmable device that accepts digital data as input, processes it according to instructions stored in its memory, and provides results as output.

The development of MOS integrated circuit technology in the 1960s led to the development of the first microprocessors. The 20-bit MP944, developed by Garrett AiResearch for the U.S. Navy's F-14 Tomcat fighter in 1970, is considered by its designer Ray Holt to be the first microprocessor. It was a multi-chip microprocessor, fabricated on six MOS chips. However, it was classified by the Navy until 1998. The 4-bit Intel 4004, released in 1971, was the first single-chip microprocessor.

Modern microprocessors typically include on-chip cache memories. The number of transistors used for these cache memories typically far exceeds the number of transistors used to implement the logic of the microprocessor (that is, excluding the cache). For example, the last DEC Alpha chip uses 90% of its transistors for cache.

Processor	Transistor count	Year	Designer	Process (nm)	Area (mm^{2})	Transistor density (tr./mm^{2})
MP944 (20-bit, 6-chip, 28 chips total)	74,442 (5,360 excl. ROM & RAM)	1970 (Note: Declassified 1998)	Garrett AiResearch	?	?	?
Intel 4004 (4-bit, 16-pin)	2,250	1971	Intel	10,000 nm	12 mm^{2}	188
TMX 1795 (8-bit, 24-pin)	3,078	1971	Texas Instruments	?	30.64 mm^{2}	100.5
Intel 8008 (8-bit, 18-pin)	3,500	1972	Intel	10,000 nm	14 mm^{2}	250
NEC μCOM-4 (4-bit, 42-pin)	2,500	1973	NEC	7,500 nm	?	?
Toshiba TLCS-12 (12-bit)	11,000+	1973	Toshiba	6,000 nm	32.45 mm^{2}	340+
Intel 4040 (4-bit, 16-pin)	3,000	1974	Intel	10,000 nm	12 mm^{2}	250
Motorola 6800 (8-bit, 40-pin)	4,100	1974	Motorola	6,000 nm	16 mm^{2}	256
Intel 8080 (8-bit, 40-pin)	6,000	1974	Intel	6,000 nm	20 mm^{2}	300
TMS 1000 (4-bit, 28-pin)	8,000 (Note: The TMS1000 is a microcontroller, the transistor count includes memory and input/output controllers, not just the CPU.)	1974	Texas Instruments	8,000 nm	11 mm^{2}	730
HP Nanoprocessor (8-bit, 40-pin)	4,639 (Note: 2,668 without depletion mode pull-up transistors)	1974	Hewlett-Packard	?	19 mm^{2}	?
MOS Technology 6502 (8-bit, 40-pin)	4,528 (Note: 3,510 without depletion mode pull-up transistors)	1975	MOS Technology	8,000 nm	21 mm^{2}	216
Intersil IM6100 (12-bit, 40-pin; clone of PDP-8)	4,000	1975	Intersil	?	?	?
CDP 1801 (8-bit, 2-chip, 40-pin)	5,000	1975	RCA	?	?	?
RCA 1802 (8-bit, 40-pin)	5,000	1976	RCA	5,000 nm	27 mm^{2}	185
Zilog Z80 (8-bit, 4-bit ALU, 40-pin)	8,500 (Note: 6,813 without depletion mode pull-up transistors)	1976	Zilog	4,000 nm	18 mm^{2}	470
Intel 8085 (8-bit, 40-pin)	6,500	1976	Intel	3,000 nm	20 mm^{2}	325
TMS9900 (16-bit)	8,000	1976	Texas Instruments	6,000 nm	?	?
Bellmac-8 (8-bit)	7,000	1977	Bell Labs	5,000 nm	?	?
Motorola 6809 (8-bit with some 16-bit features, 40-pin)	9,000	1978	Motorola	5,000 nm	21 mm^{2}	430
Intel 8086 (16-bit, 40-pin)	29,000	1978	Intel	3,000 nm	33 mm^{2}	880
Zilog Z8000 (16-bit)	17,500	1979	Zilog	5,000-6,000 nm (design rules)	39.31 mm^{2} (238x256 mil^{2})	445
Intel 8088 (16-bit, 8-bit data bus)	29,000	1979	Intel	3,000 nm	33 mm^{2}	880
Motorola 68000 (16/32-bit, 32-bit registers, 16-bit ALU)	68,000	1979	Motorola	3,500 nm	44 mm^{2}	1,550
Intel 8051 (8-bit, 40-pin)	50,000	1980	Intel	?	?	?
WDC 65C02	11,500	1981	WDC	3,000 nm	6 mm^{2}	1,920
ROMP (32-bit)	45,000	1981	IBM	2,000 nm	58.52 mm^{2}	770
Intel 80186 (16-bit, 68-pin)	55,000	1982	Intel	3,000 nm	60 mm^{2}	920
Intel 80286 (16-bit, 68-pin)	134,000	1982	Intel	1,500 nm	49 mm^{2}	2,730
WDC 65C816 (8/16-bit)	22,000	1983	WDC	3,000 nm	9 mm^{2}	2,400
NEC V20	63,000	1984	NEC	?	?	?
Motorola 68020 (32-bit; 114 pins used)	190,000	1984	Motorola	2,000 nm	85 mm^{2}	2,200
Intel 80386 (32-bit, 132-pin; no cache)	275,000	1985	Intel	1,500 nm	104 mm^{2}	2,640
ARM 1 (32-bit; no cache)	25,000	1985	Acorn	3,000 nm	50 mm^{2}	500
Novix NC4016 (16-bit)	16,000	1985	Harris Corporation	3,000 nm	?	?
SPARC MB86900 (32-bit; no cache)	110,000	1986	Fujitsu	1,200 nm	?	?
NEC V60 (32-bit; no cache)	375,000	1986	NEC	1,500 nm	?	?
ARM 2 (32-bit, 84-pin; no cache)	27,000	1986	Acorn	2,000 nm	30.25 mm^{2}	890
Z80000 (32-bit; very small cache)	91,000	1986	Zilog	?	?	?
NEC V70 (32-bit; no cache)	385,000	1987	NEC	1,500 nm	?	?
Hitachi Gmicro/200	730,000	1987	Hitachi	1,000 nm	?	?
Motorola 68030 (32-bit, very small caches)	273,000	1987	Motorola	800 nm	102 mm^{2}	2,680
TI Explorer's 32-bit Lisp machine chip	553,000	1987	Texas Instruments	2,000 nm	?	?
DEC WRL MultiTitan	180,000	1988	DEC WRL	1,500 nm	61 mm^{2}	2,950
Intel i960 (32-bit, 33-bit memory subsystem, no cache)	250,000	1988	Intel	1,500 nm	?	?
Intel i960CA (32-bit, cache)	600,000	1989	Intel	800 nm	143 mm^{2}	4,200
Intel i860 (32/64-bit, 128-bit SIMD, cache, VLIW)	1,000,000	1989	Intel	?	?	?
Intel 80486 (32-bit, 8 KB cache)	1,180,235	1989	Intel	1,000 nm	173 mm^{2}	6,822
ARM 3 (32-bit, 4 KB cache)	310,000	1989	Acorn	1,500 nm	87 mm^{2}	3,600
POWER1 (9-chip module, 72 kB of cache)	6,900,000	1990	IBM	1,000 nm	1,283.61 mm^{2}	5,375
Motorola 68040 (32-bit, 8 KB caches)	1,200,000	1990	Motorola	650 nm	152 mm^{2}	7,900
R4000 (64-bit, 16 KB of caches)	1,350,000	1991	MIPS	1,000 nm	213 mm^{2}	6,340
ARM 6 (32-bit, no cache for this 60 variant)	35,000	1991	ARM	800 nm	?	?
Hitachi SH-1 (32-bit, no cache)	600,000	1992	Hitachi	800 nm	100 mm^{2}	6,000
Intel i960CF (32-bit, cache)	900,000	1992	Intel	?	125 mm^{2}	7,200
Alpha 21064 (64-bit, 290-pin; 16 KB of caches)	1,680,000	1992	DEC	750 nm	233.52 mm^{2}	7,190
Hitachi HARP-1 (32-bit, cache)	2,800,000	1993	Hitachi	500 nm	267 mm^{2}	10,500
Pentium (32-bit, 16 KB of caches)	3,100,000	1993	Intel	800 nm	294 mm^{2}	10,500
POWER2 (8-chip module, 288 kB of cache)	23,037,000	1993	IBM	720 nm	1,217.39 mm^{2}	18,923
ARM700 (32-bit; 8 KB cache)	578,977	1994	ARM	700 nm	68.51 mm^{2}	8,451
MuP21 (21-bit, 40-pin; includes video)	7,000	1994	Offete Enterprises	1,200 nm	?	?
Motorola 68060 (32-bit, 16 KB of caches)	2,500,000	1994	Motorola	600 nm	218 mm^{2}	11,500
PowerPC 601 (32-bit, 32 KB of caches)	2,800,000	1994	Apple, IBM, Motorola	600 nm	121 mm^{2}	23,000
PowerPC 603 (32-bit, 16 KB of caches)	1,600,000	1994	Apple, IBM, Motorola	500 nm	84.76 mm^{2}	18,900
PowerPC 603e (32-bit, 32 KB of caches)	2,600,000	1995	Apple, IBM, Motorola	500 nm	98 mm^{2}	26,500
Alpha 21164 EV5 (64-bit, 112 kB cache)	9,300,000	1995	DEC	500 nm	298.65 mm^{2}	31,140
SA-110 (32-bit, 32 KB of caches)	2,500,000	1995	Acorn, DEC, Apple	350 nm	50 mm^{2}	50,000
Pentium Pro (32-bit, 16 KB of caches; L2 cache on-package, but on separate die)	5,500,000	1995	Intel	500 nm	307 mm^{2}	18,000
PA-8000 64-bit, no cache	3,800,000	1995	HP	500 nm	337.69 mm^{2}	11,300
Alpha 21164A EV56 (64-bit, 112 kB cache)	9,660,000	1996	DEC	350 nm	208.8 mm^{2}	46,260
AMD K5 (32-bit, caches)	4,300,000	1996	AMD	500 nm	251 mm^{2}	17,000
Pentium II Klamath (32-bit, 64-bit SIMD, caches)	7,500,000	1997	Intel	350 nm	195 mm^{2}	39,000
AMD K6 (32-bit, caches)	8,800,000	1997	AMD	350 nm	162 mm^{2}	54,000
F21 (21-bit; includes e.g. video)	15,000	1997	Offete Enterprises	?	?	?
AVR (8-bit, 40-pin; w/memory)	140,000 (48,000 excl. memory)	1997	Nordic VLSI/Atmel	?	?	?
Pentium II Deschutes (32-bit, large cache)	7,500,000	1998	Intel	250 nm	113 mm^{2}	66,000
Alpha 21264 EV6 (64-bit)	15,200,000	1998	DEC	350 nm	313.96 mm^{2}	48,400
Alpha 21164PC PCA57 (64-bit, 48 kB cache)	5,700,000	1998	Samsung	280 nm	100.5 mm^{2}	56,700
Hitachi SH-4 (32-bit, caches)	3,200,000	1998	Hitachi	250 nm	57.76 mm^{2}	55,400
ARM 9TDMI (32-bit, no cache)	111,000	1999	Acorn	350 nm	4.8 mm^{2}	23,100
Pentium III Katmai (32-bit, 128-bit SIMD, caches)	9,500,000	1999	Intel	250 nm	128 mm^{2}	74,000
Emotion Engine (64-bit, 128-bit SIMD, cache)	10,500,000 – 13,500,000	1999	Sony, Toshiba	250 nm	239.7 mm^{2}	43,800 – 56,300
Pentium II Mobile Dixon (32-bit, caches)	27,400,000	1999	Intel	180 nm	180 mm^{2}	152,000
AMD K6-III (32-bit, caches)	21,300,000	1999	AMD	250 nm	118 mm^{2}	181,000
AMD K7 (32-bit, caches)	22,000,000	1999	AMD	250 nm	184 mm^{2}	120,000
Gekko (32-bit, large cache)	21,000,000	2000	IBM, Nintendo	180 nm	43 mm^{2}	490,000 (check)
Pentium III Coppermine (32-bit, large cache)	21,000,000	2000	Intel	180 nm	80 mm^{2}	263,000
Pentium 4 Willamette (32-bit, large cache)	42,000,000	2000	Intel	180 nm	217 mm^{2}	194,000
SPARC64 V (64-bit, large cache)	191,000,000	2001	Fujitsu	130 nm	290 mm^{2}	659,000
Pentium III Tualatin (32-bit, large cache)	45,000,000	2001	Intel	130 nm	81 mm^{2}	556,000
Pentium 4 Northwood (32-bit, large cache)	55,000,000	2002	Intel	130 nm	145 mm^{2}	379,000
Itanium 2 McKinley (64-bit, large cache)	220,000,000	2002	Intel	180 nm	421 mm^{2}	523,000
Alpha 21364 (64-bit, 946-pin, SIMD, very large caches)	152,000,000	2003	DEC	180 nm	397 mm^{2}	383,000
AMD K7 Barton (32-bit, large cache)	54,300,000	2003	AMD	130 nm	101 mm^{2}	538,000
AMD K8 (64-bit, large cache)	105,900,000	2003	AMD	130 nm	193 mm^{2}	548,700
Pentium M Banias (32-bit)	77,000,000	2003	Intel	130 nm	83 mm^{2}	928,000
Itanium 2 Madison 6M (64-bit)	410,000,000	2003	Intel	130 nm	374 mm^{2}	1,096,000
PlayStation 2 single chip (CPU + GPU)	53,500,000	2003	Sony, Toshiba	90 nm 130 nm	86 mm^{2}	622,100
Pentium 4 Prescott (32-bit, large cache)	112,000,000	2004	Intel	90 nm	110 mm^{2}	1,018,000
Pentium M Dothan (32-bit)	144,000,000	2004	Intel	90 nm	87 mm^{2}	1,655,000
SPARC64 V+ (64-bit, large cache)	400,000,000	2004	Fujitsu	90 nm	294 mm^{2}	1,360,000
Itanium 2 (64-bit;9 MB cache)	592,000,000	2004	Intel	130 nm	432 mm^{2}	1,370,000
Pentium 4 Prescott-2M (32-bit, large cache)	169,000,000	2005	Intel	90 nm	143 mm^{2}	1,182,000
Pentium D Smithfield (64-bit, large cache)	228,000,000	2005	Intel	90 nm	206 mm^{2}	1,107,000
Xenon (64-bit, 128-bit SIMD, large cache)	165,000,000	2005	IBM	90 nm	?	?
Cell (32-bit, cache)	250,000,000	2005	Sony, IBM, Toshiba	90 nm	221 mm^{2}	1,131,000
Pentium 4 Cedar Mill (32-bit, large cache)	184,000,000	2006	Intel	65 nm	90 mm^{2}	2,044,000
Pentium D Presler (64-bit, large cache)	362,000,000	2006	Intel	65 nm	162 mm^{2}	2,235,000
Core 2 Duo Conroe (dual-core 64-bit, large caches)	291,000,000	2006	Intel	65 nm	143 mm^{2}	2,035,000
Dual-core Itanium 2 (64-bit, SIMD, large caches)	1,700,000,000	2006	Intel	90 nm	596 mm^{2}	2,852,000
AMD K10 quad-core 2M L3 (64-bit, large caches)	463,000,000	2007	AMD	65 nm	283 mm^{2}	1,636,000
ARM Cortex-A9 (32-bit, (optional) SIMD, caches)	26,000,000	2007	ARM	45 nm	31 mm^{2}	839,000
Core 2 Duo Wolfdale (dual-core 64-bit, SIMD, caches)	411,000,000	2007	Intel	45 nm	107 mm^{2}	3,841,000
POWER6 (64-bit, large caches)	789,000,000	2007	IBM	65 nm	341 mm^{2}	2,314,000
Core 2 Duo Allendale (dual-core 64-bit, SIMD, large caches)	169,000,000	2007	Intel	65 nm	111 mm^{2}	1,523,000
Uniphier	250,000,000	2007	Matsushita	45 nm	?	?
SPARC64 VI (64-bit, SIMD, large caches)	540,000,000	2007	Fujitsu	90 nm	421 mm^{2}	1,283,000
Core 2 Duo Wolfdale 3M (dual-core 64-bit, SIMD, large caches)	230,000,000	2008	Intel	45 nm	83 mm^{2}	2,771,000
Core i7 (quad-core 64-bit, SIMD, large caches)	731,000,000	2008	Intel	45 nm	263 mm^{2}	2,779,000
AMD K10 quad-core 6M L3 (64-bit, SIMD, large caches)	758,000,000	2008	AMD	45 nm	258 mm^{2}	2,938,000
Atom (32-bit, large cache)	47,000,000	2008	Intel	45 nm	24 mm^{2}	1,958,000
SPARC64 VII (64-bit, SIMD, large caches)	600,000,000	2008	Fujitsu	65 nm	445 mm^{2}	1,348,000
Six-core Xeon 7400 (64-bit, SIMD, large caches)	1,900,000,000	2008	Intel	45 nm	503 mm^{2}	3,777,000
Six-core Opteron 2400 (64-bit, SIMD, large caches)	904,000,000	2009	AMD	45 nm	346 mm^{2}	2,613,000
SPARC64 VIIIfx (64-bit, SIMD, large caches)	760,000,000	2009	Fujitsu	45 nm	513 mm^{2}	1,481,000
Atom (Pineview) 64-bit, 1-core, 512 kB L2 cache	123,000,000	2010	Intel	45 nm	66 mm^{2}	1,864,000
Atom (Pineview) 64-bit, 2-core, 1 MB L2 cache	176,000,000	2010	Intel	45 nm	87 mm^{2}	2,023,000
SPARC T3 (16-core 64-bit, SIMD, large caches)	1,000,000,000	2010	Sun/Oracle	40 nm	377 mm^{2}	2,653,000
Six-core Core i7 (Gulftown)	1,170,000,000	2010	Intel	32 nm	240 mm^{2}	4,875,000
POWER7 32M L3 (8-core 64-bit, SIMD, large caches)	1,200,000,000	2010	IBM	45 nm	567 mm^{2}	2,116,000
Quad-core z196 (64-bit, very large caches)	1,400,000,000	2010	IBM	45 nm	512 mm^{2}	2,734,000
Quad-core Itanium Tukwila (64-bit, SIMD, large caches)	2,000,000,000	2010	Intel	65 nm	699 mm^{2}	2,861,000
Xeon Nehalem-EX (8-core 64-bit, SIMD, large caches)	2,300,000,000	2010	Intel	45 nm	684 mm^{2}	3,363,000
SPARC64 IXfx (64-bit, SIMD, large caches)	1,870,000,000	2011	Fujitsu	40 nm	484 mm^{2}	3,864,000
Quad-core + GPU Core i7 (64-bit, SIMD, large caches)	1,160,000,000	2011	Intel	32 nm	216 mm^{2}	5,370,000
Six-core Core i7/8-core Xeon E5 (Sandy Bridge-E/EP) (64-bit, SIMD, large caches)	2,270,000,000	2011	Intel	32 nm	434 mm^{2}	5,230,000
Xeon Westmere-EX (10-core 64-bit, SIMD, large caches)	2,600,000,000	2011	Intel	32 nm	512 mm^{2}	5,078,000
Atom "Medfield" (64-bit)	432,000,000	2012	Intel	32 nm	64 mm^{2}	6,750,000
SPARC64 X (64-bit, SIMD, caches)	2,990,000,000	2012	Fujitsu	28 nm	600 mm^{2}	4,983,000
AMD Bulldozer (8-core 64-bit, SIMD, caches)	1,200,000,000	2012	AMD	32 nm	315 mm^{2}	3,810,000
Quad-core + GPU AMD Trinity (64-bit, SIMD, caches)	1,303,000,000	2012	AMD	32 nm	246 mm^{2}	5,297,000
Quad-core + GPU Core i7 Ivy Bridge (64-bit, SIMD, caches)	1,400,000,000	2012	Intel	22 nm	160 mm^{2}	8,750,000
POWER7+ (8-core 64-bit, SIMD, 80 MB L3 cache)	2,100,000,000	2012	IBM	32 nm	567 mm^{2}	3,704,000
Six-core zEC12 (64-bit, SIMD, large caches)	2,750,000,000	2012	IBM	32 nm	597 mm^{2}	4,606,000
Itanium Poulson (8-core 64-bit, SIMD, caches)	3,100,000,000	2012	Intel	32 nm	544 mm^{2}	5,699,000
Xeon Phi (61-core 32-bit, 512-bit SIMD, caches)	5,000,000,000	2012	Intel	22 nm	720 mm^{2}	6,944,000
Apple A7 (dual-core 64/32-bit ARM64, "mobile SoC", SIMD, caches)	1,000,000,000	2013	Apple	28 nm	102 mm^{2}	9,804,000
Six-core Core i7 Ivy Bridge E (64-bit, SIMD, caches)	1,860,000,000	2013	Intel	22 nm	256 mm^{2}	7,266,000
POWER8 (12-core 64-bit, SIMD, caches)	4,200,000,000	2013	IBM	22 nm	650 mm^{2}	6,462,000
Xbox One main SoC (64-bit, SIMD, caches)	5,000,000,000	2013	Microsoft, AMD	28 nm	363 mm^{2}	13,770,000
Quad-core + GPU Core i7 Haswell (64-bit, SIMD, caches)	1,400,000,000	2014	Intel	22 nm	177 mm^{2}	7,910,000
Apple A8 (dual-core 64/32-bit ARM64 "mobile SoC", SIMD, caches)	2,000,000,000	2014	Apple	20 nm	89 mm^{2}	22,470,000
Core i7 Haswell-E (8-core 64-bit, SIMD, caches)	2,600,000,000	2014	Intel	22 nm	355 mm^{2}	7,324,000
Apple A8X (tri-core 64/32-bit ARM64 "mobile SoC", SIMD, caches)	3,000,000,000	2014	Apple	20 nm	128 mm^{2}	23,440,000
Xeon Ivy Bridge-EX (15-core 64-bit, SIMD, caches)	4,310,000,000	2014	Intel	22 nm	541 mm^{2}	7,967,000
Xeon Haswell-E5 (18-core 64-bit, SIMD, caches)	5,560,000,000	2014	Intel	22 nm	661 mm^{2}	8,411,000
Quad-core + GPU GT2 Core i7 Skylake K (64-bit, SIMD, caches)	1,750,000,000	2015	Intel	14 nm	122 mm^{2}	14,340,000
Dual-core + GPU Iris Core i7 Broadwell-U (64-bit, SIMD, caches)	1,900,000,000	2015	Intel	14 nm	133 mm^{2}	14,290,000
Apple A9 (dual-core 64/32-bit ARM64 "mobile SoC", SIMD, caches)	2,000,000,000+	2015	Apple	14 nm (Samsung)	96 mm^{2} (Samsung)	20,800,000+
Apple A9 (dual-core 64/32-bit ARM64 "mobile SoC", SIMD, caches)	2,000,000,000+	2015	Apple	16 nm (TSMC)	104.5 mm^{2} (TSMC)	19,100,000+
Apple A9X (dual core 64/32-bit ARM64 "mobile SoC", SIMD, caches)	3,000,000,000+	2015	Apple	16 nm	143.9 mm^{2}	20,800,000+
IBM z13 (64-bit, caches)	3,990,000,000	2015	IBM	22 nm	678 mm^{2}	5,885,000
IBM z13 Storage Controller	7,100,000,000	2015	IBM	22 nm	678 mm^{2}	10,472,000
SPARC M7 (32-core 64-bit, SIMD, caches)	10,000,000,000	2015	Oracle	20 nm	?	?
Core i7 Broadwell-E (10-core 64-bit, SIMD, caches)	3,200,000,000	2016	Intel	14 nm	246 mm^{2}	13,010,000
Apple A10 Fusion (quad-core 64/32-bit ARM64 "mobile SoC", SIMD, caches)	3,300,000,000	2016	Apple	16 nm	125 mm^{2}	26,400,000
HiSilicon Kirin 960 (octa-core 64/32-bit ARM64 "mobile SoC", SIMD, caches)	4,000,000,000	2016	Huawei	16 nm	110.00 mm^{2}	36,360,000
Xeon Broadwell-E5 (22-core 64-bit, SIMD, caches)	7,200,000,000	2016	Intel	14 nm	456 mm^{2}	15,790,000
Xeon Phi (72-core 64-bit, 512-bit SIMD, caches)	8,000,000,000	2016	Intel	14 nm	683 mm^{2}	11,710,000
Qualcomm Snapdragon 835 (octa-core 64/32-bit ARM64 "mobile SoC", SIMD, caches)	3,000,000,000	2016	Qualcomm	10 nm	72.3 mm^{2}	41,490,000
Apple A11 Bionic (hexa-core 64/32-bit ARM64 "mobile SoC", SIMD, caches)	4,300,000,000	2017	Apple	10 nm	89.23 mm^{2}	48,190,000
AMD Zen CCX (core complex unit: 4 cores, 8 MB L3 cache)	1,400,000,000	2017	AMD	14 nm (GF 14LPP)	44 mm^{2}	31,800,000
AMD Zeppelin SoC Ryzen (64-bit, SIMD, caches)	4,800,000,000	2017	AMD	14 nm	192 mm^{2}	25,000,000
AMD Ryzen 5 1600 Ryzen (64-bit, SIMD, caches)	4,800,000,000	2017	AMD	14 nm	213 mm^{2}	22,530,000
IBM z14 (64-bit, SIMD, caches)	6,100,000,000	2017	IBM	14 nm	696 mm^{2}	8,764,000
IBM z14 Storage Controller (64-bit)	9,700,000,000	2017	IBM	14 nm	696 mm^{2}	13,940,000
HiSilicon Kirin 970 (octa-core 64/32-bit ARM64 "mobile SoC", SIMD, caches)	5,500,000,000	2017	Huawei	10 nm	96.72 mm^{2}	56,900,000
Xbox One X (Project Scorpio) main SoC (64-bit, SIMD, caches)	7,000,000,000	2017	Microsoft, AMD	16 nm	360 mm^{2}	19,440,000
Xeon Platinum 8180 (28-core 64-bit, SIMD, caches)	8,000,000,000	2017	Intel	14 nm	?	?
Xeon (unspecified)	7,100,000,000	2017	Intel	14 nm	672 mm^{2}	10,570,000
POWER9 (64-bit, SIMD, caches)	8,000,000,000	2017	IBM	14 nm	695 mm^{2}	11,500,000
Freedom U500 Base Platform Chip (E51, 4×U54) RISC-V (64-bit, caches)	250,000,000	2017	SiFive	28 nm	~30 mm^{2}	8,330,000
SPARC64 XII (12-core 64-bit, SIMD, caches)	5,450,000,000	2017	Fujitsu	20 nm	795 mm^{2}	6,850,000
Apple A10X Fusion (hexa-core 64/32-bit ARM64 "mobile SoC", SIMD, caches)	4,300,000,000	2017	Apple	10 nm	96.40 mm^{2}	44,600,000
Centriq 2400 (64/32-bit, SIMD, caches)	18,000,000,000	2017	Qualcomm	10 nm	398 mm^{2}	45,200,000
AMD Epyc (32-core 64-bit, SIMD, caches)	19,200,000,000	2017	AMD	14 nm	768 mm^{2}	25,000,000
Qualcomm Snapdragon 845 (octa-core 64/32-bit ARM64 "mobile SoC", SIMD, caches)	5,300,000,000	2017	Qualcomm	10 nm	94 mm^{2}	56,400,000
Qualcomm Snapdragon 850 (octa-core 64/32-bit ARM64 "mobile SoC", SIMD, caches)	5,300,000,000	2017	Qualcomm	10 nm	94 mm^{2}	56,400,000
HiSilicon Kirin 710 (octa-core ARM64 "mobile SoC", SIMD, caches)	5,500,000,000	2018	Huawei	12 nm	?	?
Apple A12 Bionic (hexa-core ARM64 "mobile SoC", SIMD, caches)	6,900,000,000	2018	Apple	7 nm	83.27 mm^{2}	82,900,000
HiSilicon Kirin 980 (octa-core ARM64 "mobile SoC", SIMD, caches)	6,900,000,000	2018	Huawei	7 nm	74.13 mm^{2}	93,100,000
Qualcomm Snapdragon 8cx / SCX8180 (octa-core ARM64 "mobile SoC", SIMD, caches)	8,500,000,000	2018	Qualcomm	7 nm	112 mm^{2}	75,900,000
Apple A12X Bionic (octa-core 64/32-bit ARM64 "mobile SoC", SIMD, caches)	10,000,000,000	2018	Apple	7 nm	122 mm^{2}	82,000,000
Fujitsu A64FX (64/32-bit, SIMD, caches)	8,786,000,000	2018	Fujitsu	7 nm	?	?
Tegra Xavier SoC (64/32-bit)	9,000,000,000	2018	Nvidia	12 nm	350 mm^{2}	25,700,000
Qualcomm Snapdragon 855 (octa-core 64/32-bit ARM64 "mobile SoC", SIMD, caches)	6,700,000,000	2018	Qualcomm	7 nm	73 mm^{2}	91,800,000
AMD Zen 2 core (0.5 MB L2 + 4 MB L3 cache)	475,000,000	2019	AMD	7 nm	7.83 mm^{2}	60,664,000
AMD Zen 2 CCX (core complex: 4 cores, 16 MB L3 cache)	1,900,000,000	2019	AMD	7 nm	31.32 mm^{2}	60,664,000
AMD Zen 2 CCD (core complex die: 8 cores, 32 MB L3 cache)	3,800,000,000	2019	AMD	7 nm	74 mm^{2}	51,350,000
AMD Zen 2 client I/O die	2,090,000,000	2019	AMD	12 nm	125 mm^{2}	16,720,000
AMD Zen 2 server I/O die	8,340,000,000	2019	AMD	12 nm	416 mm^{2}	20,050,000
AMD Zen 2 Renoir die	9,800,000,000	2019	AMD	7 nm	156 mm^{2}	62,820,000
AMD Ryzen 7 3700X (64-bit, SIMD, caches, I/O die)	5,990,000,000 (Note: 3,900,000,000 core chiplet die, 2,090,000,000 I/O die)	2019	AMD	7 & 12 nm (TSMC)	199 (74+125) mm^{2}	30,100,000
HiSilicon Kirin 990 4G	8,000,000,000	2019	Huawei	7 nm	90.00 mm^{2}	89,000,000
Apple A13 (hexa-core 64-bit ARM64 "mobile SoC", SIMD, caches)	8,500,000,000	2019	Apple	7 nm	98.48 mm^{2}	86,300,000
IBM z15 CP chip (12 cores, 256 MB L3 cache)	9,200,000,000	2019	IBM	14 nm	696 mm^{2}	13,220,000
IBM z15 SC chip (960 MB L4 cache)	12,200,000,000	2019	IBM	14 nm	696 mm^{2}	17,530,000
AMD Ryzen 9 3900X (64-bit, SIMD, caches, I/O die)	9,890,000,000	2019	AMD	7 & 12 nm (TSMC)	273 mm^{2}	36,230,000
HiSilicon Kirin 990 5G	10,300,000,000	2019	Huawei	7 nm	113.31 mm^{2}	90,900,000
AWS Graviton2 (64-bit, 64-core ARM-based, SIMD, caches)	30,000,000,000	2019	Amazon	7 nm	?	?
AMD Epyc Rome (64-bit, SIMD, caches)	39,540,000,000	2019	AMD	7 & 12 nm (TSMC)	1,008 mm^{2}	39,226,000
Qualcomm Snapdragon 865 (octa-core 64/32-bit ARM64 "mobile SoC", SIMD, caches)	10,300,000,000	2019	Qualcomm	7 nm	83.54 mm^{2}	123,300,000
TI Jacinto TDA4VM (ARM A72, DSP, SRAM)	3,500,000,000	2020	Texas Instruments	16 nm	?	?
Apple A14 Bionic (hexa-core 64-bit ARM64 "mobile SoC", SIMD, caches)	11,800,000,000	2020	Apple	5 nm	88 mm^{2}	134,100,000
Apple M1 (octa-core 64-bit ARM64 SoC, SIMD, caches)	16,000,000,000	2020	Apple	5 nm	119 mm^{2}	134,500,000
HiSilicon Kirin 9000	15,300,000,000	2020	Huawei	5 nm	114 mm^{2}	134,200,000
AMD Zen 3 CCX (core complex unit: 8 cores, 32 MB L3 cache)	4,080,000,000	2020	AMD	7 nm	68 mm^{2}	60,000,000
AMD Zen 3 CCD (core complex die)	4,150,000,000	2020	AMD	7 nm	81 mm^{2}	51,230,000
Core 11th gen Rocket Lake (8-core 64-bit, SIMD, large caches)	6,000,000,000+	2021	Intel	14 nm +++ 14 nm	276 mm^{2}	37,500,000 or 21,800,000+
AMD Ryzen 7 5800H (64-bit, SIMD, caches, I/O and GPU)	10,700,000,000	2021	AMD	7 nm	180 mm^{2}	59,440,000
AMD Epyc 7763 (Milan) (64-core, 64-bit)	?	2021	AMD	7 & 12 nm (TSMC)	1,064 mm^{2} (8×81+416)	?
Apple A15	15,000,000,000	2021	Apple	5 nm	107.68 mm^{2}	139,300,000
Apple M1 Pro (10-core, 64-bit)	33,700,000,000	2021	Apple	5 nm	245 mm^{2}	137,600,000
Apple M1 Max (10-core, 64-bit)	57,000,000,000	2021	Apple	5 nm	420.2 mm^{2}	135,600,000
Power10 dual-chip module (30 SMT8 cores or 60 SMT4 cores)	36,000,000,000	2021	IBM	7 nm	1,204 mm^{2}	29,900,000
Dimensity 9000 (ARM64 SoC)	15,300,000,000	2021	Mediatek	4 nm (TSMC N4)	?	?
Apple A16 (ARM64 SoC)	16,000,000,000	2022	Apple	4 nm	?	?
Apple M1 Ultra (dual-chip module, 2×10 cores)	114,000,000,000	2022	Apple	5 nm	840.5 mm^{2}	135,600,000
AMD Epyc 7773X (Milan-X) (multi-chip module, 64 cores, 768 MB L3 cache)	26,000,000,000 + Milan	2022	AMD	7 & 12 nm (TSMC)	1,352 mm^{2} (Milan + 8×36)	?
IBM Telum dual-chip module (2×8 cores, 2×256 MB cache)	45,000,000,000	2022	IBM	7 nm (Samsung)	1,060 mm^{2}	42,450,000
Apple M2 (octa-core 64-bit ARM64 SoC, SIMD, caches)	20,000,000,000	2022	Apple	5 nm	?	?
Dimensity 9200 (ARM64 SoC)	17,000,000,000	2022	Mediatek	4 nm (TSMC N4P)	?	?
Qualcomm Snapdragon 8 Elite Gen 5 (octa-core ARM64 "mobile SoC", SIMD, caches)	24,000,000,000	2025	Qualcomm	3 nm	126.2 mm^{2}	160,000,000
Qualcomm Snapdragon 8 Gen 2 (octa-core ARM64 "mobile SoC", SIMD, caches)	16,000,000,000	2022	Qualcomm	4 nm	120 mm^{2}	133,000,000
AMD EPYC Genoa (4th gen/9004 series) 13-chip module (up to 96 cores and 384 MB (L3) + 96 MB (L2) cache)	90,000,000,000	2022	AMD	5 nm (CCD); 6 nm (IOD)	1,263.34 mm^{2} 12×72.225 (CCD); 396.64 (IOD)	71,240,000
HiSilicon Kirin 9030 Pro	15,880,000,000	2025	Huawei	7 nm	140 mm^{2}	113,400,000
HiSilicon Kirin 9000s	9,510,000,000	2023	Huawei	7 nm	107 mm^{2}	107,690,000
Apple M4 (deca-core 64-bit ARM64 SoC, SIMD, caches)	28,000,000,000	2024	Apple	3 nm	?	?
Apple M3 (octa-core 64-bit ARM64 SoC, SIMD, caches)	25,000,000,000	2023	Apple	3 nm	?	?
Apple M3 Pro (dodeca-core 64-bit ARM64 SoC, SIMD, caches)	37,000,000,000	2023	Apple	3 nm	?	?
Apple M3 Max (16-core 64-bit ARM64 SoC, SIMD, caches)	92,000,000,000	2023	Apple	3 nm	?	?
Apple A17	19,000,000,000	2023	Apple	3 nm	103.8 mm^{2}	183,044,315
Sapphire Rapids quad-chip module (up to 60 cores and 112.5 MB of cache)	44,000,000,000– 48,000,000,000	2023	Intel	10 nm ESF (Intel 7)	1,600 mm^{2}	27,500,000– 30,000,000
Apple M2 Pro (12-core 64-bit ARM64 SoC, SIMD, caches)	40,000,000,000	2023	Apple	5 nm	?	?
Apple M2 Max (12-core 64-bit ARM64 SoC, SIMD, caches)	67,000,000,000	2023	Apple	5 nm	?	?
Apple M2 Ultra (two M2 Max dies)	134,000,000,000	2023	Apple	5 nm	?	?
AMD Epyc Bergamo (4th gen/97X4 series) 9-chip module (up to 128 cores and 256 MB (L3) + 128 MB (L2) cache)	82,000,000,000	2023	AMD	5 nm (CCD); 6 nm (IOD)	?	?
AMD Instinct MI300A (multi-chip module, 24 cores, 128 GB GPU memory + 256 MB (LLC/L3) cache)	146,000,000,000	2023	AMD	5 nm (CCD, GCD); 6 nm (IOD)	1,017 mm^{2}	144,000,000
RV32-WUJI: 3-atom-thick molybdenum disulfide on sapphire; RISC-V architecture	5931	2025	?	3000 nm	?	?
NVIDIA Vera (multi-chip module, 88-cores 64-bit Armv9.2, 176MB L2 + 162MB L3 cache)	227,000,000,000	2026	Nvidia	3 nm	?	?
Processor	Transistor count	Year	Designer	Process (nm)	Area (mm^{2})	Transistor density (tr./mm^{2})

=== GPUs ===
A graphics processing unit (GPU) is a specialized electronic circuit designed to rapidly manipulate and alter memory to accelerate the building of images in a frame buffer intended for output to a display.

The designer refers to the technology company that designs the logic of the integrated circuit chip (such as Nvidia and AMD). The manufacturer ("Fab.") refers to the semiconductor company that fabricates the chip using its semiconductor manufacturing process at a foundry (such as TSMC and Samsung Semiconductor). The transistor count in a chip is dependent on a manufacturer's fabrication process, with smaller semiconductor nodes typically enabling higher transistor density and thus higher transistor counts.

The random-access memory (RAM) that comes with GPUs (such as VRAM, SGRAM or HBM) greatly increases the total transistor count, with the memory typically accounting for the majority of transistors in a graphics card. For example, Nvidia's Tesla P100 has 15 billion FinFETs (16 nm) in the GPU in addition to 16 GB of HBM2 memory, totaling about 150 billion MOSFETs on the graphics card. The following table does not include the memory. For memory transistor counts, see the Memory section below.

Processor	Transistor count	Year	Designer(s)	Fab(s)	Process	Area	Transistor density (tr./mm^{2})	Ref
μPD7220 GDC	40,000	1982	NEC	NEC	5,000 nm	?	?	
ARTC HD63484	60,000	1984	Hitachi	Hitachi	?	?	?	
CBM Agnus	21,000	1985	Commodore	CSG	5,000 nm	?	?	
YM7101 VDP	100,000	1988	Yamaha, Sega	Yamaha	?	?	?	
Tom & Jerry	750,000	1993	Flare	IBM	?	?	?	
VDP1	1,000,000	1994	Sega	Hitachi	500 nm	?	?	
Sony GPU	1,000,000	1994	Toshiba	LSI	500 nm	?	?	
NV1	1,000,000	1995	Nvidia, Sega	SGS	500 nm	90 mm^{2}	11,000	
Reality Coprocessor	2,600,000	1996	SGI	NEC	350 nm	81 mm^{2}	32,100	
PowerVR	1,200,000	1996	VideoLogic	NEC	350 nm	?	?	
Voodoo Graphics	1,000,000	1996	3dfx	TSMC	500 nm	?	?	
Voodoo Rush	1,000,000	1997	3dfx	TSMC	500 nm	?	?	
NV3	3,500,000	1997	Nvidia	SGS, TSMC	350 nm	90 mm^{2}	38,900	
i740	3,500,000	1998	Intel, Real3D	Real3D	350 nm	?	?	
Voodoo 2	4,000,000	1998	3dfx	TSMC	350 nm	?	?	
Voodoo Rush	4,000,000	1998	3dfx	TSMC	350 nm	?	?	
NV4	7,000,000	1998	Nvidia	TSMC	350 nm	90 mm^{2}	78,000	
PowerVR2 CLX2	10,000,000	1998	VideoLogic	NEC	250 nm	116 mm^{2}	86,200	
PowerVR2 PMX1	6,000,000	1999	VideoLogic	NEC	250 nm	?	?	
Rage 128	8,000,000	1999	ATI	TSMC, UMC	250 nm	70 mm^{2}	114,000	
Voodoo 3	8,100,000	1999	3dfx	TSMC	250 nm	?	?	
Graphics Synthesizer	43,000,000	1999	Sony, Toshiba	Sony, Toshiba	180 nm	279 mm^{2}	154,000	
NV5	15,000,000	1999	Nvidia	TSMC	250 nm	90 mm^{2}	167,000	
NV10	17,000,000	1999	Nvidia	TSMC	220 nm	111 mm^{2}	153,000	
NV11	20,000,000	2000	Nvidia	TSMC	180 nm	65 mm^{2}	308,000	
NV15	25,000,000	2000	Nvidia	TSMC	180 nm	81 mm^{2}	309,000	
Voodoo 4	14,000,000	2000	3dfx	TSMC	220 nm	?	?	
Voodoo 5	28,000,000	2000	3dfx	TSMC	220 nm	?	?	
R100	30,000,000	2000	ATI	TSMC	180 nm	97 mm^{2}	309,000	
Flipper	51,000,000	2000	ArtX	NEC	180 nm	106 mm^{2}	481,000	
PowerVR3 KYRO	14,000,000	2001	Imagination	ST	250 nm	?	?	
PowerVR3 KYRO II	15,000,000	2001	Imagination	ST	180 nm	?	?	
NV2A	60,000,000	2001	Nvidia	TSMC	150 nm	?	?	
NV20	57,000,000	2001	Nvidia	TSMC	150 nm	128 mm^{2}	445,000	
NV25	63,000,000	2002	Nvidia	TSMC	150 nm	142 mm^{2}	444,000	
NV28	36,000,000	2002	Nvidia	TSMC	150 nm	101 mm^{2}	356,000	
NV17/18	29,000,000	2002	Nvidia	TSMC	150 nm	65 mm^{2}	446,000	
R200	60,000,000	2001	ATI	TSMC	150 nm	68 mm^{2}	882,000	
R300	107,000,000	2002	ATI	TSMC	150 nm	218 mm^{2}	490,800	
R360	117,000,000	2003	ATI	TSMC	150 nm	218 mm^{2}	536,700	
NV34	45,000,000	2003	Nvidia	TSMC	150 nm	124 mm^{2}	363,000	
NV34b	45,000,000	2004	Nvidia	TSMC	140 nm	91 mm^{2}	495,000	
NV30	125,000,000	2003	Nvidia	TSMC	130 nm	199 mm^{2}	628,000	
NV31	80,000,000	2003	Nvidia	TSMC	130 nm	121 mm^{2}	661,000	
NV35/38	135,000,000	2003	Nvidia	TSMC	130 nm	207 mm^{2}	652,000	
NV36	82,000,000	2003	Nvidia	IBM	130 nm	133 mm^{2}	617,000	
R480	160,000,000	2004	ATI	TSMC	130 nm	297 mm^{2}	538,700	
NV40	222,000,000	2004	Nvidia	IBM	130 nm	305 mm^{2}	727,900	
NV44	75,000,000	2004	Nvidia	IBM	130 nm	110 mm^{2}	681,800	
NV41	222,000,000	2005	Nvidia	TSMC	110 nm	225 mm^{2}	986,700	
NV42	198,000,000	2005	Nvidia	TSMC	110 nm	222 mm^{2}	891,900	
NV43	146,000,000	2005	Nvidia	TSMC	110 nm	154 mm^{2}	948,100	
G70	303,000,000	2005	Nvidia	TSMC, Chartered	110 nm	333 mm^{2}	909,900	
Xenos	232,000,000	2005	ATI	TSMC	90 nm	182 mm^{2}	1,275,000	
RSX Reality Synthesizer	300,000,000	2005	Nvidia, Sony	Sony	90 nm	186 mm^{2}	1,613,000	
R520	321,000,000	2005	ATI	TSMC	90 nm	288 mm^{2}	1,115,000	
RV530	157,000,000	2005	ATI	TSMC	90 nm	150 mm^{2}	1,047,000	
RV515	107,000,000	2005	ATI	TSMC	90 nm	100 mm^{2}	1,070,000	
R580	384,000,000	2006	ATI	TSMC	90 nm	352 mm^{2}	1,091,000	
G71	278,000,000	2006	Nvidia	TSMC	90 nm	196 mm^{2}	1,418,000	
G72	112,000,000	2006	Nvidia	TSMC	90 nm	81 mm^{2}	1,383,000	
G73	177,000,000	2006	Nvidia	TSMC	90 nm	125 mm^{2}	1,416,000	
G80	681,000,000	2006	Nvidia	TSMC	90 nm	480 mm^{2}	1,419,000	
G86 Tesla	210,000,000	2007	Nvidia	TSMC	80 nm	127 mm^{2}	1,654,000	
G84 Tesla	289,000,000	2007	Nvidia	TSMC	80 nm	169 mm^{2}	1,710,000	
RV560	330,000,000	2006	ATI	TSMC	80 nm	230 mm^{2}	1,435,000	
R600	700,000,000	2007	ATI	TSMC	80 nm	420 mm^{2}	1,667,000	
RV610	180,000,000	2007	ATI	TSMC	65 nm	85 mm^{2}	2,118,000	
RV630	390,000,000	2007	ATI	TSMC	65 nm	153 mm^{2}	2,549,000	
G92	754,000,000	2007	Nvidia	TSMC, UMC	65 nm	324 mm^{2}	2,327,000	
G94 Tesla	505,000,000	2008	Nvidia	TSMC	65 nm	240 mm^{2}	2,104,000	
G96 Tesla	314,000,000	2008	Nvidia	TSMC	65 nm	144 mm^{2}	2,181,000	
G98 Tesla	210,000,000	2008	Nvidia	TSMC	65 nm	86 mm^{2}	2,442,000	
GT200	1,400,000,000	2008	Nvidia	TSMC	65 nm	576 mm^{2}	2,431,000	
RV620	181,000,000	2008	ATI	TSMC	55 nm	67 mm^{2}	2,701,000	
RV635	378,000,000	2008	ATI	TSMC	55 nm	135 mm^{2}	2,800,000	
RV710	242,000,000	2008	ATI	TSMC	55 nm	73 mm^{2}	3,315,000	
RV730	514,000,000	2008	ATI	TSMC	55 nm	146 mm^{2}	3,521,000	
RV670	666,000,000	2008	ATI	TSMC	55 nm	192 mm^{2}	3,469,000	
RV770	956,000,000	2008	ATI	TSMC	55 nm	256 mm^{2}	3,734,000	
RV790	959,000,000	2008	ATI	TSMC	55 nm	282 mm^{2}	3,401,000	
G92b Tesla	754,000,000	2008	Nvidia	TSMC, UMC	55 nm	260 mm^{2}	2,900,000	
G94b Tesla	505,000,000	2008	Nvidia	TSMC, UMC	55 nm	196 mm^{2}	2,577,000	
G96b Tesla	314,000,000	2008	Nvidia	TSMC, UMC	55 nm	121 mm^{2}	2,595,000	
GT200b Tesla	1,400,000,000	2008	Nvidia	TSMC, UMC	55 nm	470 mm^{2}	2,979,000	
GT218 Tesla	260,000,000	2009	Nvidia	TSMC	40 nm	57 mm^{2}	4,561,000	
GT216 Tesla	486,000,000	2009	Nvidia	TSMC	40 nm	100 mm^{2}	4,860,000	
GT215 Tesla	727,000,000	2009	Nvidia	TSMC	40 nm	144 mm^{2}	5,049,000	
RV740	826,000,000	2009	ATI	TSMC	40 nm	137 mm^{2}	6,029,000	
Cypress RV870	2,154,000,000	2009	ATI	TSMC	40 nm	334 mm^{2}	6,449,000	
Juniper RV840	1,040,000,000	2009	ATI	TSMC	40 nm	166 mm^{2}	6,265,000	
Redwood RV830	627,000,000	2010	AMD (ATI)	TSMC	40 nm	104 mm^{2}	6,029,000	
Cedar RV810	292,000,000	2010	AMD	TSMC	40 nm	59 mm^{2}	4,949,000	
Cayman RV970	2,640,000,000	2010	AMD	TSMC	40 nm	389 mm^{2}	6,789,000	
Barts RV940	1,700,000,000	2010	AMD	TSMC	40 nm	255 mm^{2}	6,667,000	
Turks RV930	716,000,000	2011	AMD	TSMC	40 nm	118 mm^{2}	6,068,000	
Caicos RV910	370,000,000	2011	AMD	TSMC	40 nm	67 mm^{2}	5,522,000	
GF100 Fermi	3,200,000,000	2010	Nvidia	TSMC	40 nm	526 mm^{2}	6,084,000	
GF110 Fermi	3,000,000,000	2010	Nvidia	TSMC	40 nm	520 mm^{2}	5,769,000	
GF104 Fermi	1,950,000,000	2011	Nvidia	TSMC	40 nm	332 mm^{2}	5,873,000	
GF106 Fermi	1,170,000,000	2010	Nvidia	TSMC	40 nm	238 mm^{2}	4,916,000	
GF108 Fermi	585,000,000	2011	Nvidia	TSMC	40 nm	116 mm^{2}	5,043,000	
GF119 Fermi	292,000,000	2011	Nvidia	TSMC	40 nm	79 mm^{2}	3,696,000	
Tahiti GCN1	4,312,711,873	2011	AMD	TSMC	28 nm	365 mm^{2}	11,820,000	
Cape Verde GCN1	1,500,000,000	2012	AMD	TSMC	28 nm	123 mm^{2}	12,200,000	
Pitcairn GCN1	2,800,000,000	2012	AMD	TSMC	28 nm	212 mm^{2}	13,210,000	
GK110 Kepler	7,080,000,000	2012	Nvidia	TSMC	28 nm	561 mm^{2}	12,620,000	
GK104 Kepler	3,540,000,000	2012	Nvidia	TSMC	28 nm	294 mm^{2}	12,040,000	
GK106 Kepler	2,540,000,000	2012	Nvidia	TSMC	28 nm	221 mm^{2}	11,490,000	
GK107 Kepler	1,270,000,000	2012	Nvidia	TSMC	28 nm	118 mm^{2}	10,760,000	
GK208 Kepler	1,020,000,000	2013	Nvidia	TSMC	28 nm	79 mm^{2}	12,910,000	
Oland GCN1	1,040,000,000	2013	AMD	TSMC	28 nm	90 mm^{2}	11,560,000	
Bonaire GCN2	2,080,000,000	2013	AMD	TSMC	28 nm	160 mm^{2}	13,000,000	
Durango (Xbox One)	4,800,000,000	2013	AMD	TSMC	28 nm	375 mm^{2}	12,800,000	
Liverpool (PlayStation 4)	?	2013	AMD	TSMC	28 nm	348 mm^{2}	?	
Hawaii GCN2	6,300,000,000	2013	AMD	TSMC	28 nm	438 mm^{2}	14,380,000	
GM200 Maxwell	8,000,000,000	2015	Nvidia	TSMC	28 nm	601 mm^{2}	13,310,000	
GM204 Maxwell	5,200,000,000	2014	Nvidia	TSMC	28 nm	398 mm^{2}	13,070,000	
GM206 Maxwell	2,940,000,000	2014	Nvidia	TSMC	28 nm	228 mm^{2}	12,890,000	
GM107 Maxwell	1,870,000,000	2014	Nvidia	TSMC	28 nm	148 mm^{2}	12,640,000	
Tonga GCN3	5,000,000,000	2014	AMD	TSMC, GlobalFoundries	28 nm	366 mm^{2}	13,660,000	
Fiji GCN3	8,900,000,000	2015	AMD	TSMC	28 nm	596 mm^{2}	14,930,000	
Durango 2 (Xbox One S)	5,000,000,000	2016	AMD	TSMC	16 nm	240 mm^{2}	20,830,000	
Neo (PlayStation 4 Pro)	5,700,000,000	2016	AMD	TSMC	16 nm	325 mm^{2}	17,540,000	
Ellesmere/Polaris 10 GCN4	5,700,000,000	2016	AMD	Samsung, GlobalFoundries	14 nm	232 mm^{2}	24,570,000	
Baffin/Polaris 11 GCN4	3,000,000,000	2016	AMD	Samsung, GlobalFoundries	14 nm	123 mm^{2}	24,390,000	
Lexa/Polaris 12 GCN4	2,200,000,000	2017	AMD	Samsung, GlobalFoundries	14 nm	101 mm^{2}	21,780,000	
GP100 Pascal	15,300,000,000	2016	Nvidia	TSMC, Samsung	16 nm	610 mm^{2}	25,080,000	
GP102 Pascal	11,800,000,000	2016	Nvidia	TSMC, Samsung	16 nm	471 mm^{2}	25,050,000	
GP104 Pascal	7,200,000,000	2016	Nvidia	TSMC	16 nm	314 mm^{2}	22,930,000	
GP106 Pascal	4,400,000,000	2016	Nvidia	TSMC	16 nm	200 mm^{2}	22,000,000	
GP107 Pascal	3,300,000,000	2016	Nvidia	Samsung	14 nm	132 mm^{2}	25,000,000	
GP108 Pascal	1,850,000,000	2017	Nvidia	Samsung	14 nm	74 mm^{2}	25,000,000	
Scorpio (Xbox One X)	6,600,000,000	2017	AMD	TSMC	16 nm	367 mm^{2}	17,980,000	
Vega 10 GCN5	12,500,000,000	2017	AMD	Samsung, GlobalFoundries	14 nm	484 mm^{2}	25,830,000	
GV100 Volta	21,100,000,000	2017	Nvidia	TSMC	12 nm	815 mm^{2}	25,890,000	
TU102 Turing	18,600,000,000	2018	Nvidia	TSMC	12 nm	754 mm^{2}	24,670,000	
TU104 Turing	13,600,000,000	2018	Nvidia	TSMC	12 nm	545 mm^{2}	24,950,000	
TU106 Turing	10,800,000,000	2018	Nvidia	TSMC	12 nm	445 mm^{2}	24,270,000	
TU116 Turing	6,600,000,000	2019	Nvidia	TSMC	12 nm	284 mm^{2}	23,240,000	
TU117 Turing	4,700,000,000	2019	Nvidia	TSMC	12 nm	200 mm^{2}	23,500,000	
Vega 20 GCN5	13,230,000,000	2018	AMD	TSMC	7 nm	331 mm^{2}	39,970,000	
Navi 10 RDNA	10,300,000,000	2019	AMD	TSMC	7 nm	251 mm^{2}	41,040,000	
Navi 12 RDNA	?	2020	AMD	TSMC	7 nm	?	?	
Navi 14 RDNA	6,400,000,000	2019	AMD	TSMC	7 nm	158 mm^{2}	40,510,000	
Arcturus CDNA	25,600,000,000	2020	AMD	TSMC	7 nm	750 mm^{2}	34,100,000	
GA100 Ampere	54,200,000,000	2020	Nvidia	TSMC	7 nm	826 mm^{2}	65,620,000	
GA102 Ampere	28,300,000,000	2020	Nvidia	Samsung	8 nm	628 mm^{2}	45,035,000	
GA103 Ampere	22,000,000,000	2022	Nvidia	Samsung	8 nm	496 mm^{2}	44,400,000	
GA104 Ampere	17,400,000,000	2020	Nvidia	Samsung	8 nm	392 mm^{2}	44,390,000	
GA106 Ampere	12,000,000,000	2021	Nvidia	Samsung	8 nm	276 mm^{2}	43,480,000	
GA107 Ampere	8,700,000,000	2021	Nvidia	Samsung	8 nm	200 mm^{2}	43,500,000	
Navi 21 RDNA2	26,800,000,000	2020	AMD	TSMC	7 nm	520 mm^{2}	51,540,000	
Navi 22 RDNA2	17,200,000,000	2021	AMD	TSMC	7 nm	335 mm^{2}	51,340,000	
Navi 23 RDNA2	11,060,000,000	2021	AMD	TSMC	7 nm	237 mm^{2}	46,670,000	
Navi 24 RDNA2	5,400,000,000	2022	AMD	TSMC	6 nm	107 mm^{2}	50,470,000	
Aldebaran CDNA2	58,200,000,000 (MCM)	2021	AMD	TSMC	6 nm	1448–1474 mm^{2} 1480 mm^{2} 1490–1580 mm^{2}	39,500,000–40,200,000; 39,200,000; 36,800,000–39,100,000	
GH100 Hopper	80,000,000,000	2022	Nvidia	TSMC	4 nm	814 mm^{2}	98,280,000	
AD102 Ada Lovelace	76,300,000,000	2022	Nvidia	TSMC	4 nm	608.4 mm^{2}	125,411,000	
AD103 Ada Lovelace	45,900,000,000	2022	Nvidia	TSMC	4 nm	378.6 mm^{2}	121,240,000	
AD104 Ada Lovelace	35,800,000,000	2022	Nvidia	TSMC	4 nm	294.5 mm^{2}	121,560,000	
AD106 Ada Lovelace	?	2023	Nvidia	TSMC	4 nm	190 mm^{2}	?	
AD107 Ada Lovelace	?	2023	Nvidia	TSMC	4 nm	146 mm^{2}	?	
Navi 31 RDNA3	57,700,000,000 (MCM); 45,400,000,000 (GCD); 6×2,050,000,000 (MCD)	2022	AMD	TSMC	5 nm (GCD); 6 nm (MCD)	531 mm^{2} (MCM); 306 mm^{2} (GCD); 6×37.5 mm^{2} (MCD)	109,200,000 (MCM); 132,400,000 (GCD); 54,640,000 (MCD)	
Navi 32 RDNA3	28,100,000,000 (MCM)	2023	AMD	TSMC	5 nm (GCD); 6 nm (MCD)	350 mm^{2} (MCM); 200 mm^{2} (GCD); 4×37.5 mm^{2} (MCD)	80,200,000 (MCM)	
Navi 33 RDNA3	13,300,000,000	2023	AMD	TSMC	6 nm	204 mm^{2}	65,200,000	
Aqua Vanjaram CDNA3	153,000,000,000 (MCM)	2023	AMD	TSMC	5 nm (GCD); 6 nm (MCD)	?	?	
GB200 Grace Blackwell	208,000,000,000 (MCM)	2024	Nvidia	TSMC	4 nm	?	?	
GB202 Blackwell	92,200,000,000	2025	Nvidia	TSMC	4 nm	750 mm^{2}	122,600,000	
GB203 Blackwell	45,600,000,000	2025	Nvidia	TSMC	4 nm	378 mm^{2}	120,600,000	
GB205 Blackwell	31,100,000,000	2025	Nvidia	TSMC	4 nm	263 mm^{2}	118,300,000	
GB206 Blackwell	21,900,000,000	2025	Nvidia	TSMC	4 nm	181 mm^{2}	121,000,000	
GB207 Blackwell	16,900,000,000	2025	Nvidia	TSMC	4 nm	149 mm^{2}	113,400,000	
Navi 44 RDNA4	29,700,000,000	2025	AMD	TSMC	4 nm	199 mm^{2}	149,200,000	
Navi 48 RDNA4	53,900,000,000	2025	AMD	TSMC	4 nm	357 mm^{2}	151,000,000	
GR200 Rubin	336,000,000,000 (MCM)	2026	Nvidia	TSMC	3 nm	?	?	
Processor	Transistor count	Year	Designer(s)	Fab(s)	MOS process	Area	Transistor density (tr./mm^{2})	Ref

=== FPGA ===
A field-programmable gate array (FPGA) is an integrated circuit designed to be configured by a customer or a designer after manufacturing.

FPGA	Transistor count	Date of introduction	Designer	Manufacturer	Process	Area	Transistor density, tr./mm^{2}	Ref
Virtex	70,000,000	1997	Xilinx					
Virtex-E	200,000,000	1998	Xilinx					
Virtex-II	350,000,000	2000	Xilinx		130 nm			
Virtex-II PRO	430,000,000	2002	Xilinx					
Virtex-4	1,000,000,000	2004	Xilinx		90 nm			
Virtex-5	1,100,000,000	2006	Xilinx	TSMC	65 nm			
Stratix IV	2,500,000,000	2008	Altera	TSMC	40 nm			
Stratix V	3,800,000,000	2011	Altera	TSMC	28 nm			
Arria 10	5,300,000,000	2014	Altera	TSMC	20 nm			
Virtex-7 2000T	6,800,000,000	2011	Xilinx	TSMC	28 nm			
Stratix 10 SX 2800	17,000,000,000	TBD	Intel	Intel	14 nm	560 mm^{2}	30,400,000	
Virtex-Ultrascale VU440	20,000,000,000	Q1 2015	Xilinx	TSMC	20 nm			
Virtex-Ultrascale+ VU19P	35,000,000,000	2020	Xilinx	TSMC	16 nm	900 mm^{2} (Note: Estimate)	38,900,000	
Versal VC1902	37,000,000,000	2H 2019	Xilinx	TSMC	7 nm			
Stratix 10 GX 10M	43,300,000,000	Q4 2019	Intel	Intel	14 nm	1,400 mm^{2}	30,930,000	
Versal VP1802	92,000,000,000	2021 ? (Note: Versal Premium are confirmed to be shipping in 1H 2021 but nothing was mentioned about the VP1802 in particular. Usually Xilinx makes separate news for the release of its biggest devices so the VP1802 is likely to be released later.)	Xilinx	TSMC	7 nm			

=== Memory ===
Semiconductor memory is an electronic data storage device, often used as computer memory, implemented on integrated circuits. Nearly all semiconductor memories since the 1970s have used MOSFETs (MOS transistors), replacing earlier bipolar junction transistors. There are two major types of semiconductor memory: random-access memory (RAM) and non-volatile memory (NVM). In turn, there are two major RAM types: dynamic random-access memory (DRAM) and static random-access memory (SRAM), as well as two major NVM types: flash memory and read-only memory (ROM).

Typical CMOS SRAM consists of six transistors per cell. For DRAM, 1T1C, which means one transistor and one capacitor structure, is common. Capacitor charged or not is used to store 1 or 0. In flash memory, the data is stored in floating gates, and the resistance of the transistor is sensed to interpret the data stored. Depending on how fine scale the resistance could be separated, one transistor could store up to three bits, meaning eight distinctive levels of resistance possible per transistor. However, a finer scale comes with the cost of repeatability issues, and hence reliability. Typically, low grade 2-bits MLC flash is used for flash drives, so a 16 GB flash drive contains roughly 64 billion transistors.

For SRAM chips, six-transistor cells (six transistors per bit) was the standard. DRAM chips during the early 1970s had three-transistor cells (three transistors per bit), before single-transistor cells (one transistor per bit) became standard since the era of 4 Kb DRAM in the mid-1970s. In single-level flash memory, each cell contains one floating-gate MOSFET (one transistor per bit), whereas multi-level flash contains 2, 3 or 4 bits per transistor.

Flash memory chips are commonly stacked up in layers, up to 128-layer in production, and 136-layer managed, and available in end-user devices up to 69-layer from manufacturers.

Random-access memory (RAM)
Chip name	Capacity (bits)	RAM type	Transistor count	Date of introduction	Manufacturer(s)	Process	Area	Transistor density (tr./mm^{2})	Ref
—N/a	1-bit	SRAM (cell)	6	1963	Fairchild	—N/a	—N/a	?	
—N/a	1-bit	DRAM (cell)	1	1965	Toshiba	—N/a	—N/a	?	
?	8-bit	SRAM (bipolar)	48	1965	SDS, Signetics	?	?	?	
SP95	16-bit	SRAM (bipolar)	80	1965	IBM	?	?	?	
TMC3162	16-bit	SRAM (TTL)	96	1966	Transitron	—N/a	?	?	
?	?	SRAM (MOS)	?	1966	NEC	?	?	?	
?	256-bit	DRAM (IC)	256	1968	Fairchild	?	?	?	
?	64-bit	SRAM (PMOS)	384	1968	Fairchild	?	?	?	
?	144-bit	SRAM (NMOS)	864	1968	NEC	?	?	?	
1101	256-bit	SRAM (PMOS)	1,536	1969	Intel	12,000 nm	?	?	
1102	1 Kb	DRAM (PMOS)	3,072	1970	Intel, Honeywell	?	?	?	
1103	1 Kb	DRAM (PMOS)	3,072	1970	Intel	8,000 nm	10 mm^{2}	307	
μPD403	1 Kb	DRAM (NMOS)	3,072	1971	NEC	?	?	?	
?	2 Kb	DRAM (PMOS)	6,144	1971	General Instrument	?	12.7 mm^{2}	484	
2102	1 Kb	SRAM (NMOS)	6,144	1972	Intel	?	?	?	
?	8 Kb	DRAM (PMOS)	8,192	1973	IBM	?	18.8 mm^{2}	436	
5101	1 Kb	SRAM (CMOS)	6,144	1974	Intel	?	?	?	
2116	16 Kb	DRAM (NMOS)	16,384	1975	Intel	?	?	?	
2114	4 Kb	SRAM (NMOS)	24,576	1976	Intel	?	?	?	
?	4 Kb	SRAM (CMOS)	24,576	1977	Toshiba	?	?	?	
?	64 Kb	DRAM (NMOS)	65,536	1977	NTT	?	35.4 mm^{2}	1851	
?	64 Kb	DRAM (VMOS)	65,536	1979	Siemens	?	25.2 mm^{2}	2601	
?	16 Kb	SRAM (CMOS)	98,304	1980	Hitachi, Toshiba	?	?	?	
?	256 Kb	DRAM (NMOS)	262,144	1980	NEC	1,500 nm	41.6 mm^{2}	6302	
?	256 Kb	DRAM (NMOS)	262,144	1980	NTT	1,000 nm	34.4 mm^{2}	7620	
?	64 Kb	SRAM (CMOS)	393,216	1980	Matsushita	?	?	?	
?	288 Kb	DRAM	294,912	1981	IBM	?	25 mm^{2}	11,800	
?	64 Kb	SRAM (NMOS)	393,216	1982	Intel	1,500 nm	?	?	
?	256 Kb	SRAM (CMOS)	1,572,864	1984	Toshiba	1,200 nm	?	?	
?	8 Mb	DRAM	8,388,608	January 5, 1984	Hitachi	?	?	?	
?	16 Mb	DRAM (CMOS)	16,777,216	1987	NTT	700 nm	148 mm^{2}	113,400	
?	4 Mb	SRAM (CMOS)	25,165,824	1990	NEC, Toshiba, Hitachi, Mitsubishi	?	?	?	
?	64 Mb	DRAM (CMOS)	67,108,864	1991	Matsushita, Mitsubishi, Fujitsu, Toshiba	400 nm	?	?	
KM48SL2000	16 Mb	SDRAM	16,777,216	1992	Samsung	?	?	?	
?	16 Mb	SRAM (CMOS)	100,663,296	1992	Fujitsu, NEC	400 nm	?	?	
?	256 Mb	DRAM (CMOS)	268,435,456	1993	Hitachi, NEC	250 nm	?	?	
?	1 Gb	DRAM	1,073,741,824	January 9, 1995	NEC	250 nm	?	?	
?	1 Gb	DRAM	1,073,741,824	January 9, 1995	Hitachi	160 nm	?	?	
?	1 Gb	SDRAM	1,073,741,824	1996	Mitsubishi	150 nm	?	?	
?	1 Gb	SDRAM (SOI)	1,073,741,824	1997	Hyundai	?	?	?	
?	4 Gb	DRAM (4-bit)	1,073,741,824	1997	NEC	150 nm	?	?	
?	4 Gb	DRAM	4,294,967,296	1998	Hyundai	?	?	?	
?	8 Gb	SDRAM (DDR3)	8,589,934,592	April 2008	Samsung	50 nm	?	?	
?	16 Gb	SDRAM (DDR3)	17,179,869,184	2008	Samsung	50 nm	?	?	
?	32 Gb	SDRAM (HBM2)	34,359,738,368	2016	Samsung	20 nm	?	?	
?	64 Gb	SDRAM (HBM2)	68,719,476,736	2017	Samsung	20 nm	?	?	
?	128 Gb	SDRAM (DDR4)	137,438,953,472	2018	Samsung	10 nm	?	?	
?	?	RRAM (3DSoC)	?	2019	SkyWater Technology	90 nm	?	?	

Flash memory
Chip name	Capacity (bits)	Flash type	FGMOS transistor count	Date of introduction	Manufacturer(s)	Process	Area	Transistor density (tr./mm^{2})	Ref
?	256 Kb	NOR	262,144	1985	Toshiba	2,000 nm	?	?	
?	1 Mb	NOR	1,048,576	1989	Seeq, Intel	?	?	?	
?	4 Mb	NAND	4,194,304	1989	Toshiba	1,000 nm	?	?	
?	16 Mb	NOR	16,777,216	1991	Mitsubishi	600 nm	?	?	
DD28F032SA	32 Mb	NOR	33,554,432	1993	Intel	?	280 mm^{2}	120,000	
?	64 Mb	NOR	67,108,864	1994	NEC	400 nm	?	?	
?	64 Mb	NAND	67,108,864	1996	Hitachi	400 nm	?	?	
?	128 Mb	NAND	134,217,728	1996	Samsung, Hitachi	?	?	?	
?	256 Mb	NAND	268,435,456	1999	Hitachi, Toshiba	250 nm	?	?	
?	512 Mb	NAND	536,870,912	2000	Toshiba	?	?	?	
?	1 Gb	2-bit NAND	536,870,912	2001	Samsung	?	?	?	
?	1 Gb	2-bit NAND	536,870,912	2001	Toshiba, SanDisk	160 nm	?	?	
?	2 Gb	NAND	2,147,483,648	2002	Samsung, Toshiba	?	?	?	
?	8 Gb	NAND	8,589,934,592	2004	Samsung	60 nm	?	?	
?	16 Gb	NAND	17,179,869,184	2005	Samsung	50 nm	?	?	
?	32 Gb	NAND	34,359,738,368	2006	Samsung	40 nm	?	?	
THGAM	128 Gb	Stacked NAND	128,000,000,000	April 2007	Toshiba	56 nm	252 mm^{2}	507,900,000	
THGBM	256 Gb	Stacked NAND	256,000,000,000	2008	Toshiba	43 nm	353 mm^{2}	725,200,000	
THGBM2	1 Tb	Stacked 4-bit NAND	256,000,000,000	2010	Toshiba	32 nm	374 mm^{2}	684,500,000	
KLMCG8GE4A	512 Gb	Stacked 2-bit NAND	256,000,000,000	2011	Samsung	?	192 mm^{2}	1,333,000,000	
KLUFG8R1EM	4 Tb	Stacked 3-bit V-NAND	1,365,333,333,504	2017	Samsung	?	150 mm^{2}	9,102,000,000	
eUFS (1 TB)	8 Tb	Stacked 4-bit V-NAND	2,048,000,000,000	2019	Samsung	?	150 mm^{2}	13,650,000,000	
?	1 Tb	232L TLC NAND die	333,333,333,333	2022	Micron	?	68.5 mm^{2} (memory array)	4,870,000,000 (14.6 Gbit/mm^{2})	
?	16 Tb	232L package	5,333,333,333,333	2022	Micron	?	68.5 mm^{2} (memory array)	77,900,000,000 (16×14.6 Gbit/mm^{2})	

Read-only memory (ROM)
Chip name	Capacity (bits)	ROM type	Transistor count	Date of introduction	Manufacturer(s)	Process	Area	Ref
?	?	PROM	?	1956	Arma	—N/a	?	
?	1 Kb	ROM (MOS)	1,024	1965	General Microelectronics	?	?	
3301	1 Kb	ROM (bipolar)	1,024	1969	Intel	—N/a	?	
1702	2 Kb	EPROM (MOS)	2,048	1971	Intel	?	15 mm^{2}	
?	4 Kb	ROM (MOS)	4,096	1974	AMD, General Instrument	?	?	
2708	8 Kb	EPROM (MOS)	8,192	1975	Intel	?	?	
?	2 Kb	EEPROM (MOS)	2,048	1976	Toshiba	?	?	
μCOM-43 ROM	16 Kb	PROM (PMOS)	16,000	1977	NEC	?	?	
2716	16 Kb	EPROM (TTL)	16,384	1977	Intel	—N/a	?	
EA8316F	16 Kb	ROM (NMOS)	16,384	1978	Electronic Arrays	?	436 mm^{2}	
2732	32 Kb	EPROM	32,768	1978	Intel	?	?	
2364	64 Kb	ROM	65,536	1978	Intel	?	?	
2764	64 Kb	EPROM	65,536	1981	Intel	3,500 nm	?	
27128	128 Kb	EPROM	131,072	1982	Intel	?	?	
27256	256 Kb	EPROM (HMOS)	262,144	1983	Intel	?	?	
?	256 Kb	EPROM (CMOS)	262,144	1983	Fujitsu	?	?	
?	512 Kb	EPROM (NMOS)	524,288	1984	AMD	1,700 nm	?	
27512	512 Kb	EPROM (HMOS)	524,288	1984	Intel	?	?	
?	1 Mb	EPROM (CMOS)	1,048,576	1984	NEC	1,200 nm	?	
?	4 Mb	EPROM (CMOS)	4,194,304	1987	Toshiba	800 nm	?	
?	16 Mb	EPROM (CMOS)	16,777,216	1990	NEC	600 nm	?	
?	16 Mb	MROM	16,777,216	1995	AKM, Hitachi	?	?	

=== Transistor computers ===
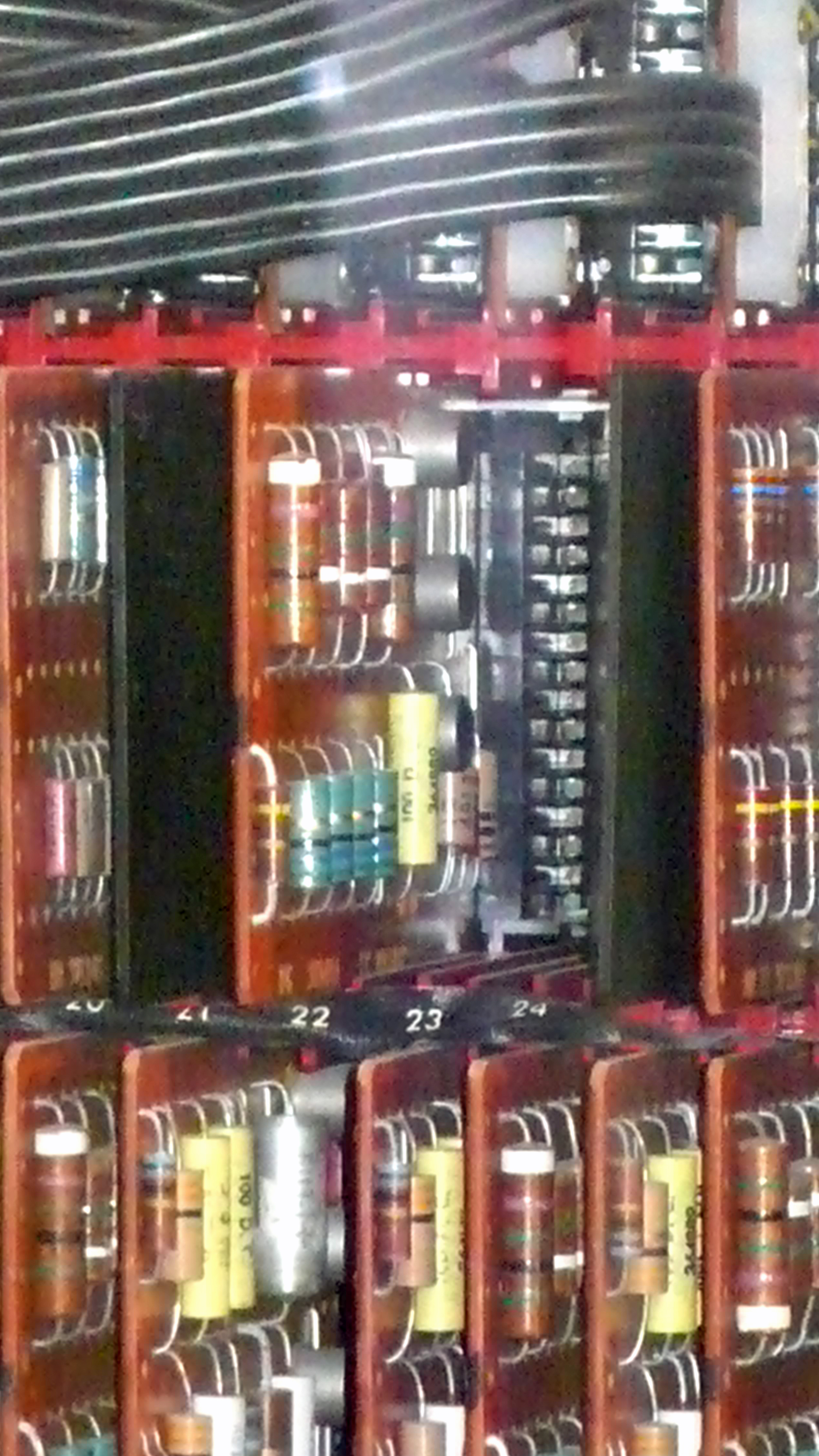
Part of an IBM 7070 card cage populated with Standard Modular System cards

Before transistors were invented, relays were used in commercial tabulating machines and experimental early computers. The world's first working programmable, fully automatic digital computer, the 1941 Z3 22-bit word length computer, had 2,600 relays, and operated at a clock frequency of about 4–5 Hz. The 1940 Complex Number Computer had fewer than 500 relays, but it was not fully programmable. The earliest practical computers used vacuum tubes and solid-state diode logic. ENIAC had 18,000 vacuum tubes, 7,200 crystal diodes, and 1,500 relays, with many of the vacuum tubes containing two triode elements.

The second generation of computers were transistor computers that featured boards filled with discrete transistors, solid-state diodes and magnetic memory cores. The experimental 1953 48-bit Transistor Computer, developed at the University of Manchester, is widely believed to be the first transistor computer to come into operation anywhere in the world (the prototype had 92 point-contact transistors and 550 diodes). A later version the 1955 machine had a total of 250 junction transistors and 1,300 point-contact diodes. The Computer also used a small number of tubes in its clock generator, so it was not the first fully transistorized. The ETL Mark III, developed at the Electrotechnical Laboratory in 1956, may have been the first transistor-based electronic computer using the stored program method. It had about "130 point-contact transistors and about 1,800 germanium diodes were used for logic elements, and these were housed on 300 plug-in packages which could be slipped in and out." The 1958 decimal architecture IBM 7070 was the first transistor computer to be fully programmable. It had about 30,000 alloy-junction germanium transistors and 22,000 germanium diodes, on approximately 14,000 Standard Modular System (SMS) cards. The 1959 MOBIDIC, short for "MOBIle DIgital Computer", at 12,000 pounds (6.0 short tons) mounted in the trailer of a semi-trailer truck, was a transistorized computer for battlefield data.

The third generation of computers used integrated circuits (ICs). The 1962 15-bit Apollo Guidance Computer used "about 4,000 "Type-G" (3-input NOR gate) circuits" for about 12,000 transistors plus 32,000 resistors. The IBM System/360, introduced 1964, used discrete transistors in hybrid circuit packs. The 1965 12-bit PDP-8 CPU had 1409 discrete transistors and over 10,000 diodes, on many cards. Later versions, starting with the 1968 PDP-8/I, used integrated circuits. The PDP-8 was later reimplemented as a microprocessor as the Intersil 6100, see below.

The next generation of computers were the microcomputers, starting with the 1971 Intel 4004, which used MOS transistors. These were used in home computers or personal computers (PCs).

This list includes early transistorized computers (second generation) and IC-based computers (third generation) from the 1950s and 1960s.

Computer	Transistor count	Year	Manufacturer	Notes	Ref
Transistor Computer	92	1953	University of Manchester	Point-contact transistors, 550 diodes. Lacked stored program capability.	
TRADIC	700	1954	Bell Labs	Point-contact transistors	
Transistor Computer (full size)	250	1955	University of Manchester	Discrete point-contact transistors, 1,300 diodes	
IBM 608	3,000	1955	IBM	Germanium transistors	
ETL Mark III	130	1956	Electrotechnical Laboratory	Point-contact transistors, 1,800 diodes, stored program capability	
Metrovick 950	200	1956	Metropolitan-Vickers	Discrete junction transistors	
NEC NEAC-2201	600	1958	NEC	Germanium transistors	
Hitachi MARS-1	1,000	1958	Hitachi		
IBM 7070	30,000	1958	IBM	Alloy-junction germanium transistors, 22,000 diodes	
Matsushita MADIC-I	400	1959	Matsushita	Bipolar transistors	
NEC NEAC-2203	2,579	1959	NEC		
Toshiba TOSBAC-2100	5,000	1959	Toshiba		
IBM 7090	50,000	1959	IBM	Discrete germanium transistors	
PDP-1	2,700	1959	Digital Equipment Corporation	Discrete transistors	
Olivetti Elea 9003	?	1959	Olivetti	300,000 (?) discrete transistors and diodes	
Mitsubishi MELCOM 1101	3,500	1960	Mitsubishi	Germanium transistors	
M18 FADAC	1,600	1960	Autonetics	Discrete transistors	
CPU of IBM 7030 Stretch	169,100	1961	IBM	World's fastest computer from 1961 to 1964	
D-17B	1,521	1962	Autonetics	Discrete transistors	
NEC NEAC-L2	16,000	1964	NEC	Ge transistors	
CDC 6600 (entire computer)	400,000	1964	Control Data Corporation	World's fastest computer from 1964 to 1969	
IBM System/360	?	1964	IBM	Hybrid circuits	
PDP-8 "Straight-8"	1,409	1965	Digital Equipment Corporation	discrete transistors, 10,000 diodes	
PDP-8/S	1,001	1966	Digital Equipment Corporation	discrete transistors, diodes	
PDP-8/I	1,409	1968	Digital Equipment Corporation	74 series TTL circuits	
Apollo Guidance Computer Block I	12,300	1966	Raytheon / MIT Instrumentation Laboratory	4,100 ICs, each containing a 3-transistor, 3-input NOR gate. (Block II had 2,800 dual 3-input NOR gates ICs.)	

=== Logic functions ===
Transistor count for generic logic functions is based on static CMOS implementation.

Function	Transistor count	Ref.
NOT	2	
Buffer	4	
NAND 2-input	4	
NOR 2-input	4	
AND 2-input	6	
OR 2-input	6	
NAND 3-input	6	
NOR 3-input	6	
XOR 2-input	6	
XNOR 2-input	8	
MUX 2-input with TG	6	
MUX 4-input with TG	18	
NOT MUX 2-input	8	
MUX 4-input	24	
1-bit full adder	24	
1-bit adder–subtractor	48	
AND-OR-INVERT	6	
Latch, D gated	8	
Flip-flop, edge triggered dynamic D with reset	12	
8-bit multiplier	3,000	
16-bit multiplier	9,000	
32-bit multiplier	21,000	
small-scale integration	2–100	
medium-scale integration	100–500	
large-scale integration	500–20,000	
very-large-scale integration	20,000–1,000,000	
ultra-large scale integration	>1,000,000	

=== Parallel systems ===
Historically, each processing element in earlier parallel systems—like all CPUs of that time—was a serial computer built out of multiple chips. As transistor counts per chip increases, each processing element could be built out of fewer chips, and then later each multi-core processor chip could contain more processing elements.

Goodyear MPP: (1983?) 8 pixel processors per chip, 3,000 to 8,000 transistors per chip.

Brunel University Scape (single-chip array-processing element): (1983) 256 pixel processors per chip, 120,000 to 140,000 transistors per chip.

Cell Broadband Engine: (2006) with 9 cores per chip, had 234 million transistors per chip.

=== Other devices ===
Device type	Device name	Transistor count	Date of introduction	Designer(s)	Manufacturer(s)	MOS process	Area	Transistor density, tr./mm^{2}	Ref
Deep learning engine / IPU (Note: "Intelligence Processing Unit")	Colossus GC2	23,600,000,000	2018	Graphcore	TSMC	16 nm	~800 mm^{2}	29,500,000	
Deep learning engine / IPU	Wafer Scale Engine	1,200,000,000,000	2019	Cerebras	TSMC	16 nm	46,225 mm^{2}	25,960,000	
Deep learning engine / IPU	Wafer Scale Engine 2	2,600,000,000,000	2020	Cerebras	TSMC	7 nm	46,225 mm^{2}	56,250,000	
Network switch	NVLink4 NVSwitch	25,100,000,000	2022	Nvidia	TSMC	N4 (4 nm)	294 mm^{2}	85,370,000	

== Transistor density ==
The transistor density is the number of transistors that are fabricated per unit area, typically measured in terms of the number of transistors per square millimeter (mm^{2}). The transistor density usually correlates with the gate length of a semiconductor node (also known as a semiconductor manufacturing process), typically measured in nanometers (nm). As of 2019, the semiconductor node with the highest transistor density is TSMC's 5 nanometer node, with 171.3 million transistors per square millimeter (note this corresponds to a transistor-transistor spacing of 76.4 nm, far greater than the relative meaningless "5nm")

=== MOSFET nodes ===
Semiconductor nodes
Node name	Transistor density (transistors/mm^{2})	Production year	Process	MOSFET	Manufacturer(s)	Ref
?	?	1960	20,000 nm	PMOS	Bell Labs	
?	?	1960	20,000 nm	NMOS	Bell Labs	
?	?	1963	?	CMOS	Fairchild	
?	?	1964	?	PMOS	General Microelectronics	
?	?	1968	20,000 nm	CMOS	RCA	
?	?	1969	12,000 nm	PMOS	Intel	
?	?	1970	10,000 nm	CMOS	RCA	
?	300	1970	8,000 nm	PMOS	Intel	
?	?	1971	10,000 nm	PMOS	Intel	
?	480	1971	?	PMOS	General Instrument	
?	?	1973	?	NMOS	Texas Instruments	
?	220	1973	?	NMOS	Mostek	
?	?	1973	7,500 nm	NMOS	NEC	
?	?	1973	6,000 nm	PMOS	Toshiba	
?	?	1976	5,000 nm	NMOS	Hitachi, Intel	
?	?	1976	5,000 nm	CMOS	RCA	
?	?	1976	4,000 nm	NMOS	Zilog	
?	?	1976	3,000 nm	NMOS	Intel	
?	1,850	1977	?	NMOS	NTT	
?	?	1978	3,000 nm	CMOS	Hitachi	
?	?	1978	2,500 nm	NMOS	Texas Instruments	
?	?	1978	2,000 nm	NMOS	NEC, NTT	
?	2,600	1979	?	VMOS	Siemens	
?	7,280	1979	1,000 nm	NMOS	NTT	
?	7,620	1980	1,000 nm	NMOS	NTT	
?	?	1983	2,000 nm	CMOS	Toshiba	
?	?	1983	1,500 nm	CMOS	Intel	
?	?	1983	1,200 nm	CMOS	Intel	
?	?	1984	800 nm	CMOS	NTT	
?	?	1987	700 nm	CMOS	Fujitsu	
?	?	1989	600 nm	CMOS	Mitsubishi, NEC, Toshiba	
?	?	1989	500 nm	CMOS	Hitachi, Mitsubishi, NEC, Toshiba	
?	?	1991	400 nm	CMOS	Matsushita, Mitsubishi, Fujitsu, Toshiba	
?	?	1993	350 nm	CMOS	Sony	
?	?	1993	250 nm	CMOS	Hitachi, NEC	
3LM	32,000	1994	350 nm	CMOS	NEC	
?	?	1995	160 nm	CMOS	Hitachi	
?	?	1996	150 nm	CMOS	Mitsubishi	
TSMC 180 nm	?	1998	180 nm	CMOS	TSMC	
CS80	?	1999	180 nm	CMOS	Fujitsu	
?	?	1999	180 nm	CMOS	Intel, Sony, Toshiba	
CS85	?	1999	170 nm	CMOS	Fujitsu	
Samsung 140 nm	?	1999	140 nm	CMOS	Samsung	
?	?	2001	130 nm	CMOS	Fujitsu, Intel	
Samsung 100 nm	?	2001	100 nm	CMOS	Samsung	
?	?	2002	90 nm	CMOS	Sony, Toshiba, Samsung	
CS100	?	2003	90 nm	CMOS	Fujitsu	
Intel 90 nm	1,450,000	2004	90 nm	CMOS	Intel	
Samsung 80 nm	?	2004	80 nm	CMOS	Samsung	
?	?	2004	65 nm	CMOS	Fujitsu, Toshiba	
Samsung 60 nm	?	2004	60 nm	CMOS	Samsung	
TSMC 45 nm	?	2004	45 nm	CMOS	TSMC	
Elpida 90 nm	?	2005	90 nm	CMOS	Elpida Memory	
CS200	?	2005	65 nm	CMOS	Fujitsu	
Samsung 50 nm	?	2005	50 nm	CMOS	Samsung	
Intel 65 nm	2,080,000	2006	65 nm	CMOS	Intel	
Samsung 40 nm	?	2006	40 nm	CMOS	Samsung	
Toshiba 56 nm	?	2007	56 nm	CMOS	Toshiba	
Matsushita 45 nm	?	2007	45 nm	CMOS	Matsushita	
Intel 45 nm	3,300,000	2008	45 nm	CMOS	Intel	
Toshiba 43 nm	?	2008	43 nm	CMOS	Toshiba	
TSMC 40 nm	?	2008	40 nm	CMOS	TSMC	
Toshiba 32 nm	?	2009	32 nm	CMOS	Toshiba	
Intel 32 nm	7,500,000	2010	32 nm	CMOS	Intel	
?	?	2010	20 nm	CMOS	Hynix, Samsung	
Intel 22 nm	15,300,000	2012	22 nm	CMOS	Intel	
IMFT 20 nm	?	2012	20 nm	CMOS	IMFT	
Toshiba 19 nm	?	2012	19 nm	CMOS	Toshiba	
Hynix 16 nm	?	2013	16 nm	FinFET	SK Hynix	
TSMC 16 nm	28,880,000	2013	16 nm	FinFET	TSMC	
Samsung 10 nm	51,820,000	2013	10 nm	FinFET	Samsung	
Intel 14 nm	37,500,000	2014	14 nm	FinFET	Intel	
14LP	32,940,000	2015	14 nm	FinFET	Samsung	
TSMC 10 nm	52,510,000	2016	10 nm	FinFET	TSMC	
12LP	36,710,000	2017	12 nm	FinFET	GlobalFoundries, Samsung	
N7FF	96,500,000 101,850,000	2017	7 nm	FinFET	TSMC	
8LPP	61,180,000	2018	8 nm	FinFET	Samsung	
7LPE	95,300,000	2018	7 nm	FinFET	Samsung	
Intel 10 nm	100,760,000 106,100,000	2018	10 nm	FinFET	Intel	
5LPE	126,530,000 133,560,000 134,900,000	2018	5 nm	FinFET	Samsung	
N7FF+	113,900,000	2019	7 nm	FinFET	TSMC	
CLN5FF	171,300,000 185,460,000	2019	5 nm	FinFET	TSMC	
Intel 7	100,760,000 106,100,000	2021	7 nm	FinFET	Intel	
4LPE	145,700,000	2021	4 nm	FinFET	Samsung	
N4	196,600,000	2021	4 nm	FinFET	TSMC	
N4P	196,600,000	2022	4 nm	FinFET	TSMC	
3GAE	202,850,000	2022	3 nm	MBCFET	Samsung	
N3	314,730,000	2022	3 nm	FinFET	TSMC	
N4X	?	2023	4 nm	FinFET	TSMC	
N3E	?	2023	3 nm	FinFET	TSMC	
3GAP	?	2023	3 nm	MBCFET	Samsung	
Intel 4	160,000,000	2023	4 nm	FinFET	Intel	
Intel 3	?	2023	3 nm	FinFET	Intel	
Intel 20A	?	2024	2 nm	RibbonFET	Intel	
Intel 18A	238,000,000	2025	sub-2 nm	RibbonFET	Intel	
2GAP	?	2025	2 nm	MBCFET	Samsung	
N2	?	2025	2 nm	GAAFET	TSMC	
Samsung 1.4 nm	?	2027	1.4 nm	?	Samsung	

== Gate count ==
In certain applications, the term gate count is preferred over the term transistor count. It refers to the number of logic gates built with transistors and other electronic devices needed to implement a design.

== See also ==
- Dennard scaling
- Electronics industry
- Integrated circuit
- List of semiconductor scale examples
- MOSFET
- Semiconductor device
- Semiconductor device fabrication
- Semiconductor industry
- Cerebras Systems
