= 10 μm =

10μm and 10 μm may refer to:

- 10 μm process, a level of MOSFET semiconductor process technology
- 10 micrometers, an order of magnitude of length
