= Stratix =

Type of FPGA integrated circuit

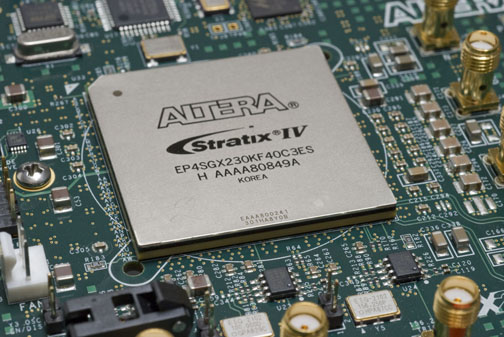
A Stratix IV FPGA

Stratix is a brand of FPGA products developed by Altera. Other FPGA product lines from Altera include e.g. Agilex, Arria and Cyclone families.

Stratix FPGAs are typically programmed in hardware description languages such as VHDL or Verilog, using the Intel Quartus Prime computer software.

Altera FPGAs have been used in automotive, optical imaging, memory, data processing, and computing applications.

== See also ==
- Virtex (FPGA)
