= Exponential Technology =

- Formerly: Renaissance Microsystems
- Industry: Semiconductor design
- Founded: 1993; 33 years ago
- Founders: George Taylor; Jim Blomgren
- Defunct: 1997
- Website: exp.com at the Wayback Machine (archived 1997-07-07)

Exponential Technology (originally Renaissance Microsystems) was a vendor of PowerPC microprocessors. The company was founded by George Taylor and Jim Blomgren in 1993. The company's plan was to use BiCMOS technology to produce very fast processors for the Apple Computer market. Logic used 3-level ECL circuits (single-ended for control logic, and differential for datapaths) while RAM structures used CMOS. Rick Shriner was the CEO. Their chips were manufactured by Hitachi.

Their product, the Exponential X704, was advertised to run at 533 MHz, but the first version of the device only ran at about 400 MHz, still significantly faster than the 233 MHz PowerPC 604e used in Macintosh computers at the time. This lower frequency along with small level-one caches, produced systems which had good but not stellar performance. This allowed Motorola (Apple's traditional processor vendor), to convince the computer maker that Motorola's future roadmap would produce processors with similar performance, hence making it less attractive for Apple to rely on the small startup company for critical technology.

Due to Apple's financial problems at the time, Exponential starting marketing the device to Apple Macintosh clone makers such as Power Computing and UMAX.

In order to diversify into other markets, a second design team was started under Paul Nixon in Austin, TX to build a BiCMOS Intel x86 processor.

Due to Apple's decision to close off the Macintosh clone market, Exponential ran out of possible customers for its chips. The company closed in 1997, though the Texas design team run by Paul Nixon continued on as EVSX. EVSX changed its name to Intrinsity, Inc. in 2000 and was purchased by Apple in 2010.

== See also ==
- Quantum Effect Devices
