= Hewlett-Packard Nanoprocessor =

The Hewlett-Packard Nanoprocessor from HP (part number 1820-1692) was a small Control-Oriented Processor microcontroller without an ALU nor the ability to add or subtract. It was released in 1974 by HP and used in many HP products. It was packaged in a 40-pin ceramic DIP that dissipated less than one watt.

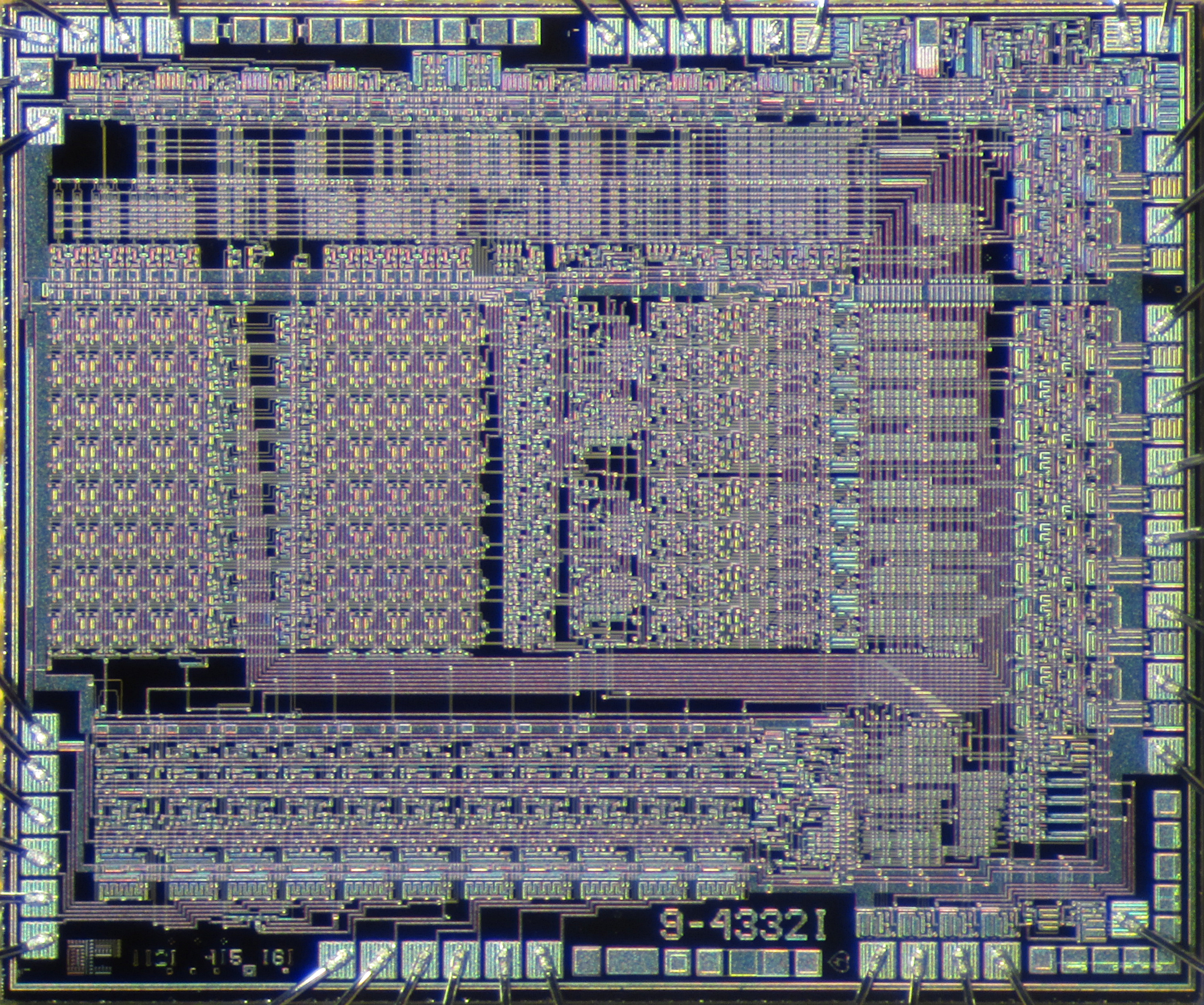
Die of HP Nanoprocessor

== Description ==
The Nanoprocessor is an 8-bit control-oriented CPU built from nMOS logic. It has an 11-bit address bus that can directly address 2048 bytes of program ROM, expandable to 512 KB with bank switching.

The processor has sixteen 8-bit registers and an 8-bit accumulator. A 1-bit Extend register (E) acts as a carry flag. As well as the 11-bit program counter (PC), it has an 11-bit subroutine return register (SRR) and 11-bit Interrupt Return Register (IRR), each acting as a single-level stack. In place of an arithmetic logic unit, it has a Control Logic Unit (CLU) and a magnitude comparator.

For input/output, the Nanoprocessor has 7 bidirectional control lines as well as 15 input and 15 output ports for 8-bit data transfers.

Code for the Nanoprocessor was written in assembly language using an assembler and loader that ran on an HP 2100 computer.
