= 6 μm process =

Semiconductor manufacturing process

The 6 μm process (6 micrometers) is the level of semiconductor process technology that was reached around 1974 by companies such as Intel.

The 6 μm process refers to the minimum size that could be reliably produced. The smallest transistors and other circuit elements on a chip made with this process were around 6 micrometers wide.

== Products featuring 6 μm manufacturing process ==
- Intel 8080 CPU launched in 1974 was manufactured using this process.
- Zilog Z80 launched in 1976 was manufactured in 4 μm.
- Intel 2116 and Mostek 4116 16K DRAMs were introduced in 1975 and 1976, respectively.

| Preceded by 10 μm process | Semiconductor device fabrication processes | Succeeded by 3 μm process |
