= 600 nm process =

Semiconductor manufacturing processes with a 600 nm MOSFET technology node

The 600 nanometer process (600 nm process) is a level of semiconductor process technology that was reached in the 1994–1995 timeframe, by most leading semiconductor companies, like Intel and IBM.

== Products featuring 600 nm manufacturing process ==
- Intel 80486DX4 CPU launched in 1994 was manufactured using this process.
- IBM/Motorola PowerPC 601, the first PowerPC chip, was produced in 600 nm.
- Intel Pentium (P54C) CPUs at 75 MHz, 90 MHz and 100 MHz were also manufactured using this process.
- Intel's fourth-generation Flash products used this process.

Preceded by 800 nm	CMOS manufacturing processes	Succeeded by 350 nm
