= X704 =

PowerPC microprocessor

The x704 is a 32-bit PowerPC microprocessor developed in 1997 by Exponential Technology. The microprocessor was notable for its high clock frequency in the range of 400 to 533 MHz, its use of bipolar transistors for logic and CMOS circuits for memory, and its failure to see use in an Apple Macintosh, the opposite of what industry observers such as Microprocessor Report had expected. Exponential Technology eventually failed as a result of the x704's lack of success, but some of its former employees founded Intrinsity, a start-up that developed a high clock frequency MIPS implementation, FastMATH. Incidentally, Intrinsity was acquired by Apple in 2010 to aid in the development of their line of ARM microprocessors.

The x704 is a superscalar microprocessor that issues up to three instructions per cycle to an arithmetic logic unit (ALU), floating-point unit (FPU) and branch unit. To realize the short cycle times, the caches were kept small, limiting its performance. There are three levels of cache. The first consisted of separate 2 KB instruction and data caches. These are direct-mapped. The L2 cache is on-die and is 32 KB in size. It is eight-way set set-associative. The L3 cache is larger, supporting capacities of 512 KB to 2 MB, and is located externally. The x704 contained 2.7 million transistors, of which 0.7 million were bipolar transistors and 2.0 million were metal oxide semiconductor (MOS), and measured 15 mm by 10 mm (150 mm^{2}). It was fabricated in a 0.5 μm BiCMOS process with six levels of interconnect. It uses 3.6 and 2.1 V power supplies and dissipates less than 85 W at 533 MHz. The x704 is packaged in a 356-ball ball grid array (BGA).
