= 350 nm process =

Semiconductor manufacturing processes with a 350 nm MOSFET technology node

The 350 nanometer process (350 nm process) is a level of semiconductor process technology that was reached in the 1995–1996 timeframe by leading semiconductor companies like Intel and IBM.

== Example processes ==
- SGS-Thomson 5LM

== Products featuring 350 nm manufacturing process ==
- MTI VR4300i (1995), used in the Nintendo 64 game console.
- Intel Pentium (P54CS, 1995), Pentium Pro (1995) and initial Pentium II CPUs (Klamath, 1997).
- AMD K5 (1996) and original AMD K6 (Model 6, 1997) CPUs.
- МЦСТ-R150 (2001).
- Parallax Propeller (2006), 8 core microcontroller.
- Atmel ATmega328, used in the Arduino UNO.
- Nvidia RIVA 128 (1997) GPU

Preceded by 600 nm	CMOS manufacturing processes	Succeeded by 250 nm
