= 10 µm process =

Semiconductor manufacturing process

The 10 μm process (10 micrometer process) is the level of MOSFET semiconductor process technology that was commercially reached around 1971, by companies such as RCA and Intel.

The 10 μm process refers to the minimum size that could be reliably produced: the half-pitch, which is the distance between two 1-metal lanes, center to center, and the gate length of a transistor; those two values used to be identical in early nodes. The smallest transistors and other circuit elements on a chip made with this process were around 10 micrometers wide.

== Products featuring 10 μm manufacturing process ==
- RCA's CD4000 series of integrated circuits began with a 20 μm process in 1968, before gradually downscaling and eventually reaching 10 μm in the next several years.
- Intel 1103, an early dynamic random-access memory (DRAM) chip launched in 1970, used an 8 μm process.
- Intel 4004 CPU launched in 1971 was manufactured using a 10 μm process.
- Intel 8008 CPU launched in 1972 was manufactured using this process.

Preceded by 20 μm process	MOSFET semiconductor device fabrication process	Succeeded by 6 μm process
