= IEEE Rebooting Computing =

Initiative to rethink the concept of computing

IEEE Rebooting Computing Task Force
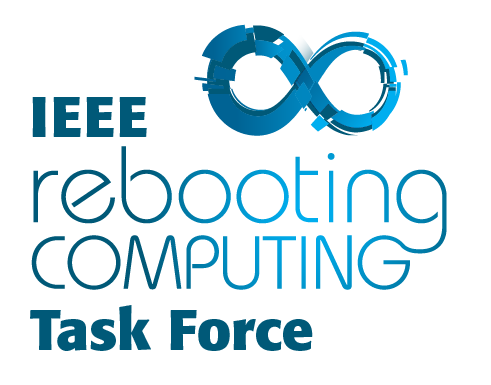
- Founded: December 2012
- Type: Professional Organization
- Purpose: Computing
- Location: Piscataway, New Jersey, U.S.
- Origins: Global initiative launched by IEEE
- Region served: Worldwide
- Method: Communications, Conferences, Digital Media, Education, Industry standards, Marketing, Publications, Web Portal
- Key people: Elie Track, Co-Chair; Tom Conte, Co-Chair; Erik DeBenedictis, Co-Chair; Bruce Kraemer, Co-Chair; Dejan Milojicic, Co-Chair; Paolo Gargini, Chair, IRDS
- Website: rebootingcomputing.ieee.org

The Task Force on Rebooting Computing (TFRC), housed within IEEE Computer Society, is the new home for the IEEE Rebooting Computing Initiative. Founded in 2013 by the IEEE Future Directions Committee, Rebooting Computing has provided an international, interdisciplinary environment where experts from a wide variety of computer-related fields can come together to explore novel approaches to future computing. IEEE Rebooting Computing began as a global initiative launched by IEEE that proposes to rethink the concept of computing through a holistic look at all aspects of computing, from the device itself to the user interface. As part of its work, IEEE Rebooting Computing provides access to various resources like conferences and educational events, feature and scholarly articles, reports, and videos.

== History ==
IEEE Future Directions Committee established an "IEEE Rebooting Computing" working group in late 2012 with the broad vision of "rebooting" the entire field of computer technology. The activities of this working group are carried out by the IEEE Rebooting Computing Committee, a team of volunteers from ten participating IEEE Societies and Councils, in conjunction with IEEE Future Directions staff members.

The term "rebooting computing" was coined by IEEE Life Fellow, Peter Denning, as part of an early U.S. National Science Foundation-sponsored project focused on revamping computer education.

In order to achieve its goal of rebooting computing, IEEE Rebooting Computing hosted four invitation-only summits between 2013 and 2015 in Washington, D.C., and Santa Cruz, California. These summits addressed the future of computing from a holistic point of view.

In 2014, IEEE Rebooting Computing adopted its logo, consisting of an exploding infinity symbol. The logo is intended to suggest the absence of limits for future computing technology.

IEEE Rebooting Computing announced the signing of a Memorandum of Understanding (MOU) with the International Technology Roadmap for Semiconductors (ITRS) in March 2015. This led in May 2016 to the formation of the IEEE International Roadmap for Devices and Systems (IRDS), which incorporated the previous mission of ITRS in semiconductor device fabrication and expanded it to encompass alternative technologies, computer architectures, and system applications.

In September 2015, IEEE Rebooting Computing announced support for the National Strategic Computing Initiative (NSCI). Established under Executive Order 13072 issued by U.S. President Barack Obama in July 2015, the NSCI calls for a coordinated Federal strategy in high-performance computing (HPC) research, development, and deployment.

In October 2015, the National Nanotechnology Initiative (NNI), an interagency program of the U.S. government, announced a "Nanotechnology-Inspired Grand Challenge in Future Computing". A key document cited by NNI as part of this grand challenge is a white paper, co-sponsored by IEEE Rebooting Computing and ITRS, entitled Sensible Machines.

In 2017, the IEEE New Initiatives Committee renewed the mandate of the Rebooting Computing Initiative, with five major activities: the International Conference on Rebooting Computing (ICRC), IRDS, the Industry Summit on the Future of Computing, the Low-Power Image Recognition Challenge (LPIRC), and a Workshop on the Confluence of Artificial Intelligence and Cybersecurity. In 2018, a new activity was added to promote the development of quantum computing.

== Purpose ==
The Three Pillars of Computing

IEEE Rebooting Computing Task Force aims to help return the computing industry to exponential computer-performance scaling, which stalled in 2005 due to energy inefficiencies of CMOS-based classical computers. Historically, computer processing power doubled every 18 months due to increasing densities of transistors per semiconductor unit. To alleviate challenges brought on by limitations in computer architectures and sustain regular processing performance gains, there was a move toward instruction-level parallelism and superscalar microprocessors. However, with rising costs associated with greater power consumption brought on by this approach signaling the end of Moore's Law, IEEE introduced the IEEE Rebooting Computing initiative.

Incorporating three fundamental pillars of rebooting computing, including energy efficiency, security, and Human Computer Interface (HCI), the initiative seeks to overcome setbacks and challenges relating to the deceleration of computational power and capacity. In turn, these efforts may also be applied in other technology sectors, such as the Internet of Things.

== Current work ==
With the goal of identifying new directions in computing and aiding industry in returning to historical exponential scaling of computer performance, IEEE Rebooting Computing encompasses a variety of activities, products, and services. Among these efforts are an online web portal, technical community, publications, conferences, and events. IEEE Rebooting Computing also maintains a collaborative partnership with IRDS, as well as responding to and participating in national and international initiatives, the NSCI and the "Nanotechnology Inspired Grand Challenge for Future Computing".

=== IEEE Rebooting Computing Web Portal ===
The web portal is the primary online home for IEEE Rebooting Computing. The website provides relevant news, information, and resources to users, such as articles authored by IEEE experts and third-party publications. It also includes access to a list of both IEEE-sponsored and general industry conferences and events, videos, and historical data from IEEE Rebooting Computing's past summits.

==== IEEE Rebooting Computing Podcasts ====
The web portal also hosts the IEEE Rebooting Computing Podcast, which is a collection of interviews with leaders in the field, updated monthly. This collection is also hosted on the video website IEEE.tv.

=== IEEE Rebooting Computing Technical Community ===
IEEE Technical Communities are virtual communities for practitioners, subject matter experts, researchers, and other technology professionals interested in specific topic areas. Open to any interested individual, the IEEE Computer Society Rebooting Computing Technical Community serves as a venue for the distribution and dissemination of news, announcements, and other information from those societies and councils taking part in the IEEE Rebooting Computing initiative. An email newsletter is distributed monthly to several thousand community members, and includes free access to specially selected recent articles of interest from the IEEE Xplore library of journals and conference proceedings. IEEE membership is not required to become a member of the IEEE Rebooting Computing Technical Community.

=== IEEE Rebooting Computing conferences and events ===
IEEE Rebooting Computing sponsors, co-sponsors, and takes part in a variety of technology conferences and events worldwide. Conference and event programming is designed to stimulate discussion of existing and emerging technologies, including challenges, benefits, and opportunities. Typically lasting anywhere from a single day to a week or more, conference and event programming generally encompasses keynote addresses, panel discussions, paper presentations, poster sessions, tutorials, and workshops in one or more tracks.

==== IEEE Rebooting Computing Summits ====
During its first several years, the initiative's flagship event series was its Rebooting Computing Summits. The inaugural IEEE Rebooting Computing Summit was held in December 2013 in Washington, D.C. The event drew business and industry, government, and academic representatives both from the U.S. and internationally for a variety of plenary lectures and brainstorming sessions.

Based on the first event, a second IEEE Rebooting Computing Summit was held in May 2014 in Santa Cruz, California. Following a similar format to the first summit, a group of invited business and trade, academia, and government experts took part in discussing neuromorphic engineering, approximate computing, and adiabatic / reversible computing.

With the first two summits serving as the event's basis, IEEE Rebooting Computing held a third summit in October 2014, in Scotts Valley, California. The theme for the third summit was "Rethinking Structures of Computation", and focused on the topics of parallel computing, security, approximation, and Human-Computer Interaction. As part of the event, attendees took part in plenary talks, a poster session, and heard details of a new government initiative in future computing research.

A fourth IEEE Rebooting Computing Summit (RCS4), with a theme of "Roadmapping the Future of Computing: Discovering How We May Compute" was held in December 2015, in Washington D.C. The event included plenary talks and breakout groups in the three tracks of "Probabilistic/Approximate Computing", "Neuromorphic Computing", and "Beyond CMOS/3D Computing", with a fourth track on "Superconducting Computing". The summit also hosted speakers from other programs promoting future computing, both governmental and industrial, including DARPA, Intelligence Advanced Research Projects Activity (IARPA), ITRS, NSCI, Office of Science and Technology Policy (OSTP), and Semiconductor Research Corporation.

==== IEEE International Conference on Rebooting Computing ====
A larger, open conference, the IEEE International Conference on Rebooting Computing (ICRC 2016), was held in October 2016, in San Diego, California. The goal of ICRC 2016 was to discover and foster novel methodologies to reinvent computing technology, including new materials and physics, devices and circuits, system and network architectures, and algorithms and software. Proceedings of the event have been published by IEEE, and videos of many of the presentations are available online. The second conference in this series, ICRC 2017, was held in November 2017 in Washington, DC, as part of IEEE Rebooting Computing Week. A third conference in this series, ICRC 2018, was held in Washington, DC in November 2018. ICRC 2019 is being planned for November 2019, tentatively in the San Francisco Bay area.

==== IEEE Industry Summit on the Future of Computing ====
In November 2017, IEEE Rebooting Computing also sponsored a distinct one-day summit, following ICRC, which addressed similar topics but with a somewhat different focus and audience. This Industry Summit featured plenary presentations by industry, government, and academic leaders on what we can expect for new computer technologies in coming decades. For example, this featured a new public announcement from IBM Research on a breakthrough in quantum computing technology. Other topics of interest included artificial intelligence, machine learning, memory-driven computing, and heterogeneous computing. A second Industry Summit was held in 2018, and plans are to continue this again in November 2019.

==== Low-Power Image Recognition Challenges ====
In June 2015, IEEE Rebooting Computing held the first-ever Low-Power Image Recognition Competition (LPIRC). Held as a one-day workshop as during the 2015 Design Automation Conference in San Francisco, California, the competition aimed to assess the state of low-power approaches to object detection in images. The competition fielded competitors from four different countries and included teams from Carnegie Mellon, Rice University, and Tsinghua University and Huawei.

Before the competition, training data was released for detection from the ImageNet Large-Scale Visual Recognition Challenge (ILSVRC). Source code of the referee system was released to the public in March 2015. For the competition, an intranet was established for the contestants to retrieve provided image files from and return answers to the competition's referee system. Teams were given 10 minutes to process images, which were ranked by detection accuracy and energy usage.

A second LPIRC was held during the June 2016 Design Automation Conference in Austin, Texas. A third LPIRC was held in July 2017 as part of the Computer Vision and Pattern Recognition Conference (CVPR) in Honolulu, Hawaii. In 2018, two LPIRC competitions were held, one at CVPR in Salt Lake City, Utah in June, and a second online competition in November. These included major new sponsors Google and Facebook. LPIRC 2019 is being planned.

An overview of the first three years of LPIRC was presented at the 2018 IEEE Conference on Design Automation and Test in Europe.

==== IEEE Workshop on Cybersecurity and Artificial Intelligence ====
In October 2017, a three-day IEEE Confluence Event was held, bringing together leaders in the fields of cybersecurity and artificial intelligence/machine learning (AI/ML). This workshop was co-chaired by Dr. Dejan Milojicic, co-chair of Rebooting Computing. The aim was to develop a strategy to coordinate efforts to apply AI/ML to improve cybersecurity worldwide. Following this workshop, an IEEE Trend Paper was published entitled "Artificial Intelligence and Machine Learning Applied to Cybersecurity", with recommendations for new standards and regulations for industry and government. A second workshop was held in November 2018, with plans to continue this effort in the future.

==== IEEE Quantum Computing Summit ====
With the growing interest and technological developments in quantum computing, IEEE determined in 2018 to expand its role in establishing metrics and benchmarks in this nascent field. This effort has been led by Dr. Erik DeBenedictis, one of the co-chairs of Rebooting Computing. An invitation-only Summit was held in August 2018 in Atlanta, Georgia, with leaders from industry, academia, and industry, and led to a White Paper on the subject.

==== IEEE Rebooting Computing Week ====
Starting in 2017, "Rebooting Computing Week" was created to have a common location for annual conferences and workshops associated with Rebooting Computing. In 2017 and 2018, this was held in November in the Washington, DC area. Events in 2018 included ICRC, the Industry Summit, IRDS Workshop, the Cybersecurity Workshop, and the Quantum Computing Workshop. Plans for 2019 are to have Rebooting Computing Week in the San Francisco Bay area, during November.

=== Publications ===
As part of the initiative's work, IEEE Rebooting Computing members and societies regularly publish papers, manuscripts, journals and magazines, and other documents. Among the various IEEE publications IEEE Rebooting Computing contributes to or features articles from on its web portal are Computer; IEEE Journal on Emerging and Selected Topics in Circuits and Systems; IEEE Journal on Exploratory Solid-State Computational Devices and Circuits; IEEE Solid-State Circuits Magazine; IEEE Spectrum; and Proceedings of the IEEE.

In December 2015, Computer published a special issue on rebooting computing, with members of the IEEE Rebooting Committee as guest editors and contributors. In November 2016, the Italian online magazine Mondo Digitale published an article entitled "Rebooting Computing: Developing a Roadmap for the Future of the Computer Industry." In March 2017, Computing in Science and Engineering published a special issue on "The End of Moore's Law", addressing alternative approaches to maintaining exponential growth in performance, even as classic device scaling may be ending.

Since 2016, Computer has published a series of columns under the heading "Rebooting Computing", coordinated by RC co-chair Dr. Erik DeBenedictis. Recent titles have included:

- A Role for IEEE in Quantum Computing
- Rebooting Computing to Avoid Meltdown and Spectre
- Opportunities and Controversies of Reversible Computing
- Computer Architecture's Changing Role in Rebooting Computing

IEEE Rebooting Computing also contributes to a variety of trade publications and news outlets, such as EE Times and Scientific Computing.

== Participating IEEE societies ==
IEEE Rebooting Computing began as a multi-society participation from a cross-section of IEEE societies with interest in numerous aspects of computing, including circuits and systems design; architectures; design automation; magnetics; nanotechnology; reliability; and superconductors.

IEEE Societies and Councils taking part in the IEEE Rebooting Computing initiative:

- IEEE Circuits and Systems Society
- IEEE Components, Packaging, and Manufacturing Technology Society
- IEEE Computer Society
- IEEE Council on Electronic Design Automation
- IEEE Technical Council on Superconductivity
- IEEE Electron Devices Society
- IEEE Magnetics Society
- IEEE Nanotechnology Council
- IEEE Reliability Society
- IEEE Solid-State Circuits Society

== Collaboration with ITRS and IRDS ==
IEEE Rebooting Computing has established a collaborative relationship with the ITRS, starting with an exchange of information in 2014. Following the signing of a formal collaboration agreement, IEEE Rebooting Computing and ITRS arranged and held joint international workshops in 2015 with the objective of identifying computer performance scaling challenges and establishing a roadmap to successfully restart computer performance scaling. IEEE Rebooting Computing further collaborated with ITRS on a new effort, known as ITRS 2.0, that extends beyond traditional Moore's Law scaling of chips to include roadmaps covering systems and applications.

ITRS Chairman Paolo Gargini said, "The ITRS shares IEEE Rebooting Computing's mission to restore computing to its historic exponential performance scaling trends so our society and future societies can benefit. Our agreement will ensure we help fundamentally shift the computer industry's focus, resources, time and attention on to new possibilities for computational performance."

On May 4, 2016, IEEE announced the launch of the "International Roadmap for Devices and Systems" (IRDS), operating as part of the IEEE Standards Association's (IEEE-SA) Industry Connections program. IRDS is sponsored by IEEE Rebooting Computing in consultation with the IEEE Computer Society and ITRS. IRDS will provide guidance on future trends in computer systems, architectures, software, chips, and other components across the entire computer industry, and is modeled on ITRS roadmaps that have previously guided the semiconductor industry during the Moore's Law era. The first IRDS Roadmap was released in the first quarter of 2018 on the IRDS Web Portal.

== Influence and impact ==
Through its summits and conferences, other educational efforts, and engagement with government, IEEE Rebooting Computing initiative has begun to influence both the technology industry and national policy efforts. The initiative is releasing the IRDS Roadmap of Future Computing, which includes development of performance benchmarks and standards for new classes of computer systems.

Addressing roadblocks in future high-performance computing, also known as exascale computing, is a key area of focus for IEEE Rebooting Computing. The initiative has been actively pursuing and aiding the industry in making progress toward possible solutions such as specialized chip architectures, millivolt switches, and 3D integrated circuits, as noted by Dr. Erik DeBenedictis of Sandia National Laboratories in "Power Problems Threaten to Strangle Exascale Computing".

In February 2015, IEEE Rebooting Computing Senior Program Director Bichlien Hoang and co-author Sin-Kuen Hawkins received a "Best Presentation Award" for their paper, "How Will Rebooting Computing Help IoT". Presented at the 18th International Conference on Intelligence in Next Generation Networks (ICIN 2015) in Paris, France, the paper described IEEE Rebooting Computing's approach to addressing technical challenges generated by IoT other key computing trends.

One of the key features of the future computing environment is its heterogeneous nature, combining different types of processors. In January 2018, the Office of Advanced Scientific Computing Research of the US Department of Energy held a Workshop on Extreme Heterogeneity. The invited plenary talk of the workshop was on the IEEE Rebooting Computing Initiative, and was presented by Prof. Tom Conte of Georgia Tech, co-chair of the Initiative. His slides are available here.

=== Media coverage ===
Media coverage of IEEE Rebooting Computing's efforts has increased. In May 2016, a New York Times feature article on the technological and economic implications of the ending of Moore's Law quoted IEEE Rebooting Co-Chair, Professor Thomas M. Conte of the Georgia Institute of Technology as saying, "The end of Moore's Law is what led to this. Just relying on the semiconductor industry is no longer enough. We have to shift and punch through some walls and break through some barriers."

Among other publications reporting on IEEE Rebooting Computing activities are EE Times; HPCWire; IEEE Spectrum; Inside HPC; Scientific Computing; SiliconANGLE; and VR World.

For example, in November 2018, Forbes Magazine published an article entitled, "IEEE Roadmaps Guide Future Memories and Applications" featuring IRDS. The 2017 ICRC was featured in a Spectrum news article entitled, "Four Strange New Ways to Compute".

== See also ==
- Association for Computing Machinery
- Big Data
- Computer architecture
- Computer security
- Computer vision
- IEEE Cloud Computing
- Supercomputer
