= Beyond CMOS =

Possible future digital logic technologies

Beyond CMOS refers to the possible future digital logic technologies beyond the scaling limits of CMOS technology. which limits device density and speeds due to heating effects.

Beyond CMOS is the name of one of the 7 focus groups in ITRS 2.0 (2013) and in its successor, the International Roadmap for Devices and Systems.

CPU clock scaling

CPUs using CMOS were released from 1986 (e.g. 12 MHz Intel 80386). As CMOS transistor dimensions were shrunk the clock speeds also increased. Since about 2004 CMOS CPU clock speeds have leveled off at about 3.5 GHz.

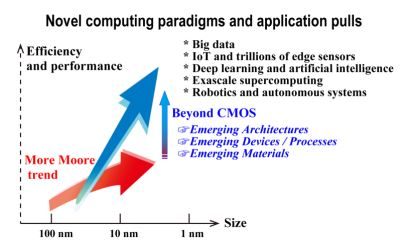
A graph of efficiency gains possible under 'more Moore' (i.e., further improvements to current technology) and 'Beyond CMOS' (i.e., a paradigm shift in technology). From the International Roadmap for Devices and Systems

CMOS devices sizes continue to shrink – see Intel's process–architecture–optimization model (and older tick–tock model) and ITRS:

- 22 nanometer Ivy Bridge in 2012
- first 14 nanometer processors shipped in Q4 2014.
- In May 2015, Samsung Electronics showed a 300 mm wafer of 10 nanometer FinFET chips.

It is not yet clear if CMOS transistors will still work below 3 nm.

== Comparisons of technology ==
About 2010 the Nanoelectronic Research Initiative (NRI) studied various circuits in various technologies.

Nikonov benchmarked (theoretically) many technologies in 2012, and updated it in 2014. The 2014 benchmarking included 11 electronic, 8 spintronic, 3 orbitronic, 2 ferroelectric, and 1 straintronics technology.

The 2015 ITRS 2.0 report included a detailed chapter on Beyond CMOS, covering RAM and logic gates.

== Some areas of investigation ==
- Magneto-electric spin-orbit logic
- Tunnel junction devices, e.g. tunnel field-effect transistor
- Indium antimonide transistors
- Carbon nanotube FET, e.g. CNT tunnel field-effect transistor
- Graphene nanoribbons
- Molecular electronics
- Spintronics — many variants
- Future low-energy electronics technologies, ultra-low dissipation conduction paths, including:
  - Topological materials
  - Exciton superfluids
- Photonics and optical computing
- Superconducting computing
  - Rapid single-flux quantum (RSFQ)

== Superconducting computing and RSFQ ==
Superconducting computing includes several beyond-CMOS technologies that use superconducting devices, namely Josephson junctions, for electronic signals processing and computing. One variant called rapid single-flux quantum (RSFQ) logic was considered promising by the NSA in a 2005 technology survey despite the drawback that available superconductors require cryogenic temperatures. More energy-efficient superconducting logic variants have been developed since 2005 and are being considered for use in large scale computing.

== See also ==
- International Technology Roadmap for Semiconductors
- International Roadmap for Devices and Systems
- Moore's law
- MOSFET scaling
- Nanostrain, a project to characterise piezoelectric materials for low power switches
- S-PULSE, the EU Shrink-Path of Ultra-Low Power Superconducting Electronics initiative
- Probabilistic complementary metal-oxide semiconductor (PCMOS)
