= Indium aluminium nitride =

Indium aluminium nitride (InAlN) is a direct bandgap semiconductor material used in the manufacture of electronic and photonic devices. It is part of the III-V group of semiconductors, being an alloy of indium nitride and aluminium nitride, and is closely related to the more widely used gallium nitride. It is of special interest in applications requiring good stability and reliability, owing to its large direct bandgap and ability to maintain operation at temperatures of up to 1000 °C., making it of particular interest to areas such as the space industry. InAlN high-electron-mobility transistors (HEMTs) are attractive candidates for such applications owing to the ability of InAlN to lattice-match to gallium nitride, eliminating a reported failure route in the closely related aluminium gallium nitride HEMTs.

InAlN is grown epitaxially by metalorganic chemical vapour deposition or molecular beam epitaxy in combination with other semiconductor materials such as gallium nitride, aluminium nitride and their associated alloys to produce semiconductor wafers, which are then used as the active component in semiconductor device manufacture. InAlN is an especially difficult material to grow epitaxially due to the widely different properties of aluminium nitride and indium nitride, and the resulting narrow window for optimised growth can lead to contamination (i.e. to produce indium gallium aluminium nitride) and poor crystal quality, at least when compared to AlGaN. Similarly, device fabrication techniques optimised for AlGaN devices may require adjustment to account for the different material properties of InAlN
