= Tom Conte =

American computer scientist (born 1964)

- Born: July 29, 1964 (age 62); Wilmington, Delaware, U.S.
- Education: University of Delaware; University of Illinois at Urbana-Champaign
- Known for: Computer performance evaluation, compiler code generation, IEEE Rebooting Computing initiative
- Awards: Fellow of the IEEE
- Scientific career
- Fields: Computer architecture
- Workplaces: University of South Carolina; North Carolina State University; Georgia Institute of Technology
- Thesis: Systematic Computer Architecture Prototyping (1992)
- Doctoral advisor: Wen-mei Hwu
- Website: www.conte.us

Thomas Martin Conte (born July 29, 1964) is an American computer scientist and engineer and currently the Associate Dean for Research and Professor of Computer Science at Georgia Institute of Technology College of Computing; and, since 2011, also Professor of Electrical and Computer Engineering (joint appointed) at Georgia Institute of Technology College of Engineering. He is a fellow of Institute of Electrical and Electronics Engineers (IEEE). He served as the president of the IEEE Computer Society in 2015.

== Biography ==
Conte received his Bachelor of Electrical Engineering degree in 1986 from the University of Delaware, his Master of Science in electrical engineering in 1988 from the University of Illinois, Urbana-Champaign, and his Doctor of Philosophy in electrical engineering in 1992 from the University of Illinois, Urbana-Champaign. He started his career as an assistant professor at the University of South Carolina. In 1995, Conte moved to North Carolina State University (in Raleigh, North Carolina), where he was an assistant professor (1995–1998), then an associate professor (1998–2002), and finally a full professor of electrical and computer engineering (2003–2008). During the summer of 2008 Conte moved to Atlanta, Georgia, and took his current position as a joint full professor of computer science in the College of Computing and Electrical & Computer Engineering in the College of Engineering at Georgia Institute of Technology. Somewhere in there (1999–2001) he took a leave of absence to DSP startup BOPS, inc. to serve as Chief Microarchitect and manager of their compiler group.

In 2004, the Department of Electrical and Computer Engineering, University of Illinois at Urbana-Champaign awarded Conte its Young Alumni Achievement Award.

Conte currently directs several Ph.D. students in topics ranging from compiler design to advanced microarchitectures. His research is or has been supported by DARPA, Compaq (formerly Digital), Hewlett-Packard (formerly Compaq), IBM, Intel, Qualcomm, Texas Instruments, Sun, NASA, and the National Science Foundation.

Conte is best known for his contributions to the fields of compiler code generation, computer architecture and computer performance evaluation.

== International Roadmap for Devices and Systems ==
In 2015, Conte worked with IEEE Fellow Paolo Gargini to bring the International Technology Roadmap for Semiconductors into the IEEE after the Semiconductor Industry Association had ceased sponsorship of the organization. In recognition of the changing landscape of the electronics and computer industries, Conte and Gargini renamed the effort the International Roadmap for Devices and Systems.
