= Non linear piezoelectric effects in polar semiconductors =

Non linear piezoelectric effects in polar semiconductors are the manifestation that the strain induced piezoelectric polarization depends not just on the product of the first order piezoelectric coefficients times the strain tensor components but also on the product of the second order (or higher) piezoelectric coefficients times products of the strain tensor components. The idea was put forward experimentally for zincblende CdTe heterostructures in 1992, It was confirmed in 1996 by the application of a hydrostatic pressure to the same heterostructures, and found to agree with the results of an ab initio approach, but also to a simple calculation using what is currently known as the Harrisson's Model. The idea was then extended to all commonly used wurtzite and zincblende semiconductors. Given the difficulty of finding direct experimental evidence for the existence of these effects, there are different schools of thought on how one can calculate reliably all the piezoelectric coefficients. On the other hand, there is widespread agreement on the fact that non linear effects are rather large and comparable to the linear terms (first order). Indirect experimental evidence of the existence of these effects has been also reported in the literature in relation to GaN and InN semiconductor optoelectronic devices.

== History ==
Non linear piezoelectric effects in polar semiconductors were first reported in 1996 by R. André et al. in zincblende cadmium telluride and later on by G.Bester et al. in 2006 and by M.A. Migliorato et al., in relation to zincblende GaAs and InAs. Different methods were used and while the influence of second (and third) order piezoelectric coefficients was generally recognized as being comparable to first order, fully ab initio and simple approaches using the Harrison's model, appeared to predict slightly different results, particularly for the magnitude of the first order coefficients.

== Formalism ==
While first order piezoelectric coefficients are of the form e_{ij}, the second and third order coefficients are in the form of a higher rank tensor, expressed as e_{ijk} and e_{ijkl}. The piezoelectric polarization would then be expressed in terms of products of the piezoelectric coefficients and strain components, products of two strain components, and products of three strain components for the first, second, and third order approximation respectively.

== Available Non Linear Piezoelectric Coefficients ==
Many more articles were published on the subject. Non linear piezoelectric coefficients are now available for many different semiconductor materials and crystal structures:

- zincblende CdTe, experiments (under pseudomorphic strain and hydrostatic pressure), and theory (ab initio and using Harrison's Model)
- zincblende GaAs and InAs, under pseudomorphic strain, using Harrison's Model
- zincblende GaAs and InAs, for any combination of diagonal strain components, using Harrison's Model
- All common III-V semiconductors in the zincblende structure using ab initio
- GaN, AlN, InN in the Wurtzite crystal structure, using Harrison's Model
- GaN, AlN, InN in the Wurtzite crystal structure, using ab initio
- ZnO in the Wurtzite crystal structure, using Harrison's Model
- Wurtzite crystal structure GaN, InN, AlN and ZnO, using ab initio
- Wurtzite crystal structure GaAs, InAs, GaP and InP, using Harrison's Model

== Non linear piezoelectricity in devices ==
Particularly for III-N semiconductors, the influence of non linear piezoelectricity was discussed in the context of light-emitting diodes:

- Influence of external pressure
- Increased efficiency

== See also ==
- Piezotronics
- Piezoelectricity
- Light-emitting diode
- Wurtzite crystal structure
