= Cryo =

Cryo- is from the Ancient Greek κρύος (krúos, “ice, icy cold, chill, frost”). Uses of the prefix Cryo- include:

== Physics and geology ==
- Cryogenics, the study of the production and behaviour of materials at very low temperatures and the study of producing extremely low temperatures
- Cryoelectronics, the study of superconductivity under cryogenic conditions and its applications
- Cryosphere, those portions of Earth's surface where water ice naturally occurs
- Cryotron, a switch that uses superconductivity
- Cryovolcano, a type of volcano that erupts volatiles instead of molten rock

== Biology and medicine ==
- Cryobiology, the branch of biology that studies the effects of low temperatures on living things
- Cryonics, the low-temperature preservation of people who cannot be sustained by contemporary medicine
- Cryoprecipitate, a blood-derived protein product used to treat some bleeding disorders
- Cryotherapy, medical treatment using cold
  - Cryoablation, tissue removal using cold
  - Cryosurgery, surgery using cold
- Cryo-electron microscopy (cryoEM), a technique that fires beams of electrons at proteins that have been frozen in solution, to deduce the biomolecules’ structure

== Other uses ==
- Cryo Interactive, a video game company
- Cryos, a planet in the video game Darkspore
- "Cryo", a song from the album R Plus Seven by Oneohtrix Point Never

== See also ==
- Kryo, a brand of CPUs by Qualcomm
