= IRDS =

IRDS may refer to:

- Infant respiratory distress syndrome. a syndrome characterized by difficult breathing in premature infants
- International Roadmap for Devices and Systems, an international body for guiding the semiconductor industry
- Information Resource Dictionary System, a United States Federal Information Processing Standard used to capture metadata during a system life cycle.
