= David August =

David August may refer to:

- David August (computer scientist) (born 1970), American professor of computer science
- David August (musician) (born 1990), German composer
