= 3 nm process =

Semiconductor manufacturing process

In semiconductor manufacturing, the "3 nm process" is the next die shrink after the "5 nm" MOSFET (metal–oxide–semiconductor field-effect transistor) technology node. South Korean chipmaker Samsung started shipping its "3 nm" gate all around (GAA) process, named 3GAA, in mid-2022. On 29 December 2022, Taiwanese chip manufacturer TSMC announced that volume production using its "3 nm" semiconductor node (N3) was underway with good yields. An enhanced "3 nm" chip process called "N3E" may have started production in 2023. American manufacturer Intel planned to start "3 nm" production in 2023.

Samsung's "3 nm" process is based on GAAFET (gate-all-around field-effect transistor) technology, a type of multi-gate MOSFET technology, while TSMC's 3 nm process still uses FinFET (fin field-effect transistor) technology, despite TSMC developing GAAFET transistors. Specifically, Samsung planned to use its own variant of GAAFET called MBCFET (multi-bridge channel field-effect transistor). Intel's process (dubbed "Intel 3", without the "nm" suffix) would use a refined, enhanced and optimized version of FinFET technology compared to its previous process nodes in terms of performance gained per watt, use of EUV lithography, and power and area improvement.

Projected node properties according to International Roadmap for Devices and Systems (2021)
Node name	Gate pitch	Metal pitch	Year
"5 nm"	51 nm	30 nm	2020
"3 nm"	48 nm	24 nm	2022
"2 nm"	45 nm	20 nm	2025
"1 nm"	40 nm	16 nm	2027

The term "3 nanometer" has no direct relation to any actual physical feature (such as gate length, metal pitch, or gate pitch) of the transistors. According to the projections contained in the 2021 update of the International Roadmap for Devices and Systems published by IEEE Standards Association Industry Connection, a "3 nm" node is expected to have a contacted gate pitch of 48 nanometers, and a tightest metal pitch of 24 nanometers.

However, in real world commercial practice, "3 nm" is used primarily as a marketing term by individual microchip manufacturers (foundries) to refer to a new, improved generation of silicon semiconductor chips in terms of increased transistor density (i.e. a higher degree of miniaturization), increased speed and reduced power consumption. There is no industry-wide agreement among different manufacturers about what numbers would define a "3 nm" node. Typically the chip manufacturer refers to its own previous process node (in this case the "5 nm node") for comparison. For example, TSMC stated in August 2020 that its 3 nm FinFET chips would reduce power consumption by 25–30% at the same speed, increase speed by 10–15% at the same amount of power and increase transistor density by about 33% compared to its previous "5 nm" FinFET chips. On the other hand, Samsung stated in June 2022 that its "3 nm" process would reduce power consumption by 45%, improve performance by 23%, and decrease surface area by 16% compared to its previous "5 nm" process. EUV lithography faces new challenges at "3 nm" which lead to the required use of multipatterning.

== History ==
=== Research and technology demos ===
In 2003, a research team at NEC fabricated the first MOSFETs with a channel length of 3 nm, using the PMOS and NMOS processes. In 2006, a team from the Korea Advanced Institute of Science and Technology (KAIST) and the National Nano Fab Center developed a 3 nm width multi-gate MOSFET, the world's smallest nanoelectronic device, based on gate-all-around (GAAFET) technology.

=== Commercialization history ===
In late 2016, TSMC announced plans to construct a "5 nm"–"3 nm" node semiconductor fabrication plant with a co-commitment investment of around US$15.7 billion.

In 2017, TSMC announced it was to begin construction of the "3 nm" semiconductor fabrication plant at the Tainan Science Park in Taiwan. TSMC plans to start volume production of the "3 nm" process node in 2023.

In early 2018, IMEC (Interuniversity Microelectronics Centre) and Cadence stated they had taped out "3 nm" test chips, using extreme ultraviolet lithography (EUV) and 193 nm immersion lithography.

In early 2019, Samsung presented plans to manufacture "3 nm" GAAFET (gate-all-around field-effect transistors) at the "3 nm" node in 2021, using its own MBCFET transistor structure that uses nanosheets; delivering a 35% performance increase, 50% power reduction and a 45% reduction in area when compared with "7 nm". Samsung's semiconductor roadmap also included products at "8", "7", "6", "5", and "4 nm" nodes.

In December 2019, Intel announced plans for "3 nm" production in 2025.

In January 2020, Samsung announced the production of the world's first "3 nm" GAAFET process prototype, and said that it was targeting mass production in 2021.

In August 2020, TSMC announced details of its "N3" process, which was new rather than being an improvement over its "N5" process. Compared with the "N5" process, the "N3" process was projected to offer a 10–15% increase in performance, or a 25–35% decrease in power consumption, with a 70% increase in logic density, a 20% increase in SRAM cell density, and a 10% increase in analog circuitry density. Since many designs included considerably more SRAM than logic - a common ratio being 70% SRAM to 30% logic = die shrinks were expected to be around 26%. TSMC was planning volume production in the second half of 2022.

In July 2021, Intel presented brand new process technology roadmap, according to which "Intel 3" process (previously named Intel 7+), the company's second node to use EUV and the last one to use FinFET before switching to Intel's RibbonFET transistor architecture, was scheduled to enter product manufacturing phase in H2 2023.

In October 2021, Samsung adjusted earlier plans and announced that the company was scheduled to start producing its customers' first "3 nm"-based chip designs in the first half of 2022, while its second generation of "3 nm" was expected in 2023.

In June 2022, at TSMC Technology Symposium, the company shared details of its N3E process technology scheduled for volume production in 2023 H2: 1.6× higher logic transistor density, 1.3× higher chip transistor density, 10–15% higher performance at iso power or 30–35% lower power at ISO performance compared to TSMC N5 v1.0 process technology, FinFLEX technology, allowing to intermix libraries with different track heights within a block etc. TSMC also introduced new members of the "3 nm" process family: high-density variant N3S, high-performance variants N3P and N3X, and N3RF for RF applications.

In June 2022, Samsung started "initial" production of a low-power, high-performance chip using 3 nm process technology with GAA architecture. According to industry sources, Qualcomm had reserved some "3 nm" production capacity from Samsung.

On 25 July 2022, Samsung celebrated the first shipment of "3 nm Gate-All-Around" chips to a Chinese cryptocurrency mining firm PanSemi. It was revealed that the newly introduced "3 nm" MBCFET process technology offers 16% higher transistor density, 23% higher performance or 45% lower power draw compared to an unspecified 5 nm process technology. Goals for the second-generation "3 nm" process technology include up to 35% higher transistor density, further reduction of power draw by up to 50% or higher performance by 30%.

On 29 December 2022, TSMC announced that volume production using its "3 nm" process technology N3 was underway with good yields. In January 2023, the company planned to start volume manufacturing using refined "3 nm" process technology called N3E in the second half of 2023.

In December 2022, at IEDM 2022 conference, TSMC disclosed a few details about their "3 nm" process technologies: contacted gate pitch of N3 is 45 nm, minimum metal pitch of N3E is 23 nm, and SRAM cell area is 0.0199 μm^{2} for N3 and 0.021 μm^{2} for N3E (same as in N5). For N3E process, depending on the number of fins in cells used for design, area scaling compared to N5 2–2 fin cells ranges from 0.64x to 0.85x, performance gains range from 11% to 32% and energy savings range from 12% to 30% (the numbers refer to Cortex-A72 core). TSMC's FinFlex technology allowed intermixing cells with different number of fins in a single chip.

Reporting from IEDM 2022, semiconductor industry expert Dick James stated that TSMC's "3 nm" processes offered only incremental improvements, because limits had been reached for fin height, gate length, and number of fins per transistor (single fin). Following the implementation of features such as single diffusion break, contact over active gate and FinFlex, no more room was left for improvement of FinFET-based process technologies.

In April 2023, at its Technology Symposium, TSMC revealed some details about their N3P and N3X processes the company had introduced earlier: N3P would offer 5% higher speed or 5–10% lower power and 1.04× higher "chip density" compared to N3E, while N3X would offer 5% speed gain at the cost of ~3.5× higher leakage and the same density compared to N3P. N3P was scheduled to enter volume production in the second half of 2024, and N3X would follow in 2025.

In July 2023, semiconductor industry research firm TechInsights said it had found that Samsung's 3 nm GAA (gate-all-around) process had been incorporated into the crypto miner ASIC (Whatsminer M56S++) from a Chinese manufacturer, MicroBT.

On 7 September 2023, MediaTek and TSMC announced that MediaTek had developed their first 3 nm chip, volume production was expected to commence in 2024.

On 22 May 2025, Xiaomi announced its first 3 nm chip XRING O1, volume production under TSMC N3E process, which had been equipped on its Xiaomi 15S Pro phone and Xiaomi Pad 7 Ultra.

== 3 nm process nodes ==
	Samsung		TSMC					Intel
Process name	3GAE; SF3E	3GAP; SF3	N3 (a.k.a. N3B)	N3E	N3P	N3X	N3C	3
Transistor type	MBCFET		FinFET					
Transistor density (MTr/mm^{2})	150	190	197	216	224		Unknown	143.37
SRAM bit-cell size (μm^{2})	Unknown	0.02	0.0199	0.021	Unknown	Unknown	Unknown	0.024
Transistor gate pitch (nm)	54	48	45	48	47	Unknown	Unknown	50
Interconnect pitch (nm)	32	Unknown	Unknown	23	Unknown	Unknown	Unknown	30
Release status	2022 risk production 2022 production 2022 shipping	2024 Q1 risk production 2024 H2 production	2021 risk production 2022 Q4 volume production 2023 H1 shipping for revenue	2023 Q4 production	2024 H2 production	2025 H2 production	2026 production	2024 Q2 production 2024 H2 shipping for revenue

Preceded by 5 nm (FinFET)	MOSFET semiconductor device fabrication process	Succeeded by 2 nm (GAAFET)
