= Nanostrain =

Former EU-funded scientific project

Nanostrain was an EU-funded project (EMRP IND54) to characterise piezoelectric materials for future fast digital switch designs.

The switching may only need a much lower voltage and be faster with lower power consumption than CMOS.

Calculations suggest that small PiezoElectronic Transistors (combining piezoelectric and piezoresistive materials) could need much less energy to switch and allow clock speeds of 30 GHz (10 times current CMOS), with a hundred times less power than today’s devices.

== Nanostrain consortium ==
The consortium includes many European national institutes and industrial partners, including IBM.

== Progress and results ==
Nanostrain was initially funded for 3 years, and included 6 work packages. Some results were reported in 2014.

A final report was published in July 2017, work continues in the EMPIR ADVENT project.

== See also ==
- Piezotronics – Devices leveraging piezoelectricity
- Beyond CMOS – Possible future digital logic technologies
