= Aluminium nitride =

Nitride of aluminum

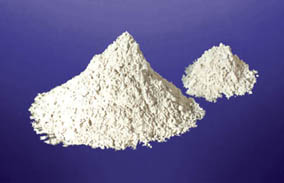
- Aluminium Nitride powder

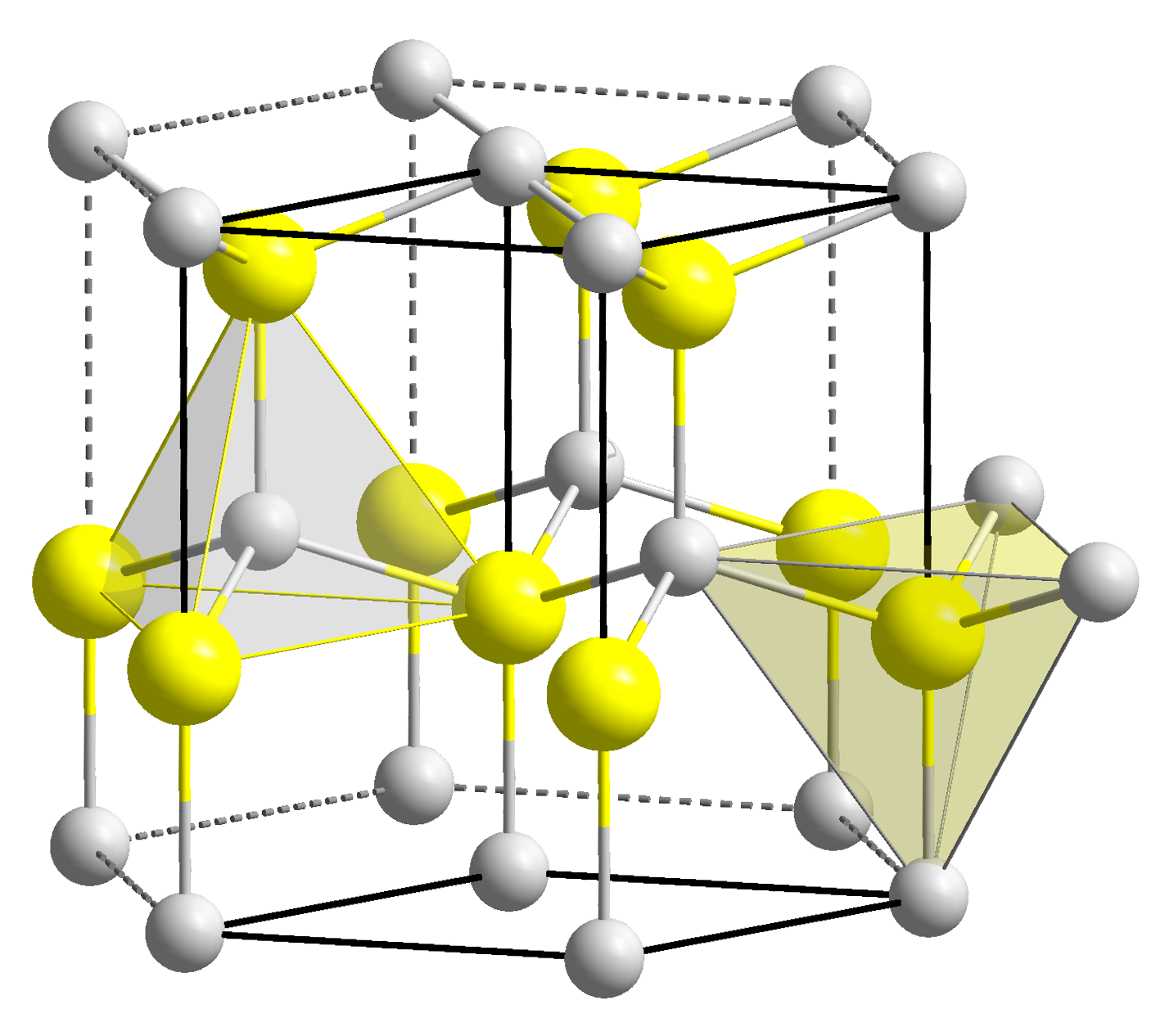

Names
- IUPAC name Aluminium nitride
- Other names AlN

Identifiers
CAS Number	24304-00-5
3D model (JSmol)	Interactive image; Interactive image
ChEBI	CHEBI:50884
ChemSpider	81668
ECHA InfoCard	100.041.931
EC Number	246-140-8
Gmelin Reference	13611
PubChem CID	90455
RTECS number	BD1055000
UNII	7K47D7P3M0
CompTox Dashboard (EPA)	DTXSID8066977
- InChI: InChI=1S/Al.N Key: PIGFYZPCRLYGLF-UHFFFAOYSA-N; InChI=1/Al.N/rAlN/c1-2 Key: PIGFYZPCRLYGLF-PXKYIXAJAH
- SMILES: [AlH2-]1[N+]47[AlH-]2[N+][AlH-]3[N+]8([AlH2-][NH+]([AlH2-]4)[AlH2-]6)[AlH-]4[N+][AlH-]5[N+]6([AlH2-]6)[Al-]78[N+]78[AlH-]([NH+]69)[NH+]5[AlH2-][NH+]4[AlH-]7[NH+]3[AlH2-][NH+]2[AlH-]8[NH+]1[AlH2-]9; [AlH2-]1[NH+]([AlH2-]6)[AlH2-][NH+]7[AlH-]2[N+][Al-]3([N+][AlH-]9[N+]5)[N+]18[Al-]45[N+][AlH-]5[NH+]6[Al-]78[N+]78[AlH2-][NH+]5[AlH2-][N+]4([AlH2-][NH+]9[AlH2-]4)[AlH-]7[N+]34[AlH2-][NH+]2[AlH2-]8

Properties
Chemical formula	AlN
Molar mass	40.989 g/mol
Appearance	white to pale-yellow solid
Density	3.255 g/cm^{3}
Melting point	2,500 °C (4,530 °F; 2,770 K)
Solubility in water	hydrolyses (powder), insoluble (monocrystalline)
Solubility	insoluble, subject of hydrolysis in water solutions of bases and acids
Band gap	6.015 eV (300 K, direct)
Electron mobility	~300 cm^{2}/(V·s)
Thermal conductivity	321 W/(m·K)
Refractive index (n_{D})	2.048（300 k, λ = 633 nm）

Structure
Crystal structure	Wurtzite (Atmospheric)
Space group	C_{6v}^{4}-P6_{3}mc, No. 186, hP4
Lattice constant	a = 0.31117 nm, c = 0.49788 nm
Formula units (Z)	2
Coordination geometry	Tetrahedral

Structure
Crystal structure	Rocksalt (High-pressure)
Space group	$O_{h}^{5}\text{-}Fm\overline{3}m$, No. 225, cF8
Lattice constant	a = 0.3938 nm
Formula units (Z)	4

Thermochemistry
Heat capacity (C)	30.1 J/(mol·K)
Std molar entropy (S^{⦵}_{298})	20.2 J/(mol·K)
Std enthalpy of formation (Δ_{f}H^{⦵}_{298})	−318.0 kJ/mol
Gibbs free energy (Δ_{f}G^{⦵})	−287.0 kJ/mol

Hazards
- GHS labelling
Pictograms	(GHS07: Exclamation mark) (GHS08: Health hazard) (GHS09: Environmental hazard)
Signal word	Warning
Hazard statements	H315, H319, H335, H373, H411
Precautionary statements	P260, P264, P271, P280, P301+P330+P331, P302+P352, P303+P361+P353, P304+P340, P305+P351+P338, P310, P312, P321, P332+P313, P337+P313, P362, P363, P403+P233, P405, P501
NFPA 704 (fire diamond)	1 0 0
- Except where otherwise noted, data are given for materials in their standard state (at 25 °C [77 °F], 100 kPa). verify (what is ?) Infobox references

Aluminium nitride (AlN) is a solid nitride of aluminium, which was first synthesized in 1862 by F. Briegleb and A. Geuther.

AlN is a wide-bandgap semiconductor composed of aluminium and nitrogen. It crystallizes predominantly in the wurtzite structure and exhibits a direct band gap of approximately 6 eV at room temperature. The exceptionally wide bandgap enables applications in deep-ultraviolet optoelectronics, while the material's thermal conductivity 321 W/(m·K), and strong polarization effects make it an important buffer and template material for III-nitride quantum heterostructures used in high-power and high-frequency electronic devices.

== Structures and physical properties ==
AlN exists primarily in the hexagonal wurtzite crystal structure, which plays a central role in determining its physical properties. In this structure, aluminium and nitrogen atoms alternate along the crystallographic c-axis, with each atom tetrahedrally coordinated to four atoms of the opposite species adopting a sp^{3}-like bonding and an in-plane constant of 3.11Å.

In addition to the thermodynamically stable wurtzite phase, AlN can also form a metastable cubic zincblende phase, typically realized in thin films grown under non-equilibrium conditions. It is predicted that the cubic phase of AlN (zb-AlN) can exhibit superconductivity at high pressures. At sufficiently high pressures, a phase transition to a rocksalt structure has been reported. The lattice parameters and the excess of the ground state energies for different AlN crystal structures at zero pressure are listed in the table below:

Lattice parameters and the excess of the ground state energies at zero pressure
AlN structure
	Wurtzite	Zinc blende	Rocksalt
a (Å)	3.12 (3.11)	4.39 (4.37)	4.06 (4.06)
c/a	1.6028	—	—
Energy (meV/atom)	0.0	23	204

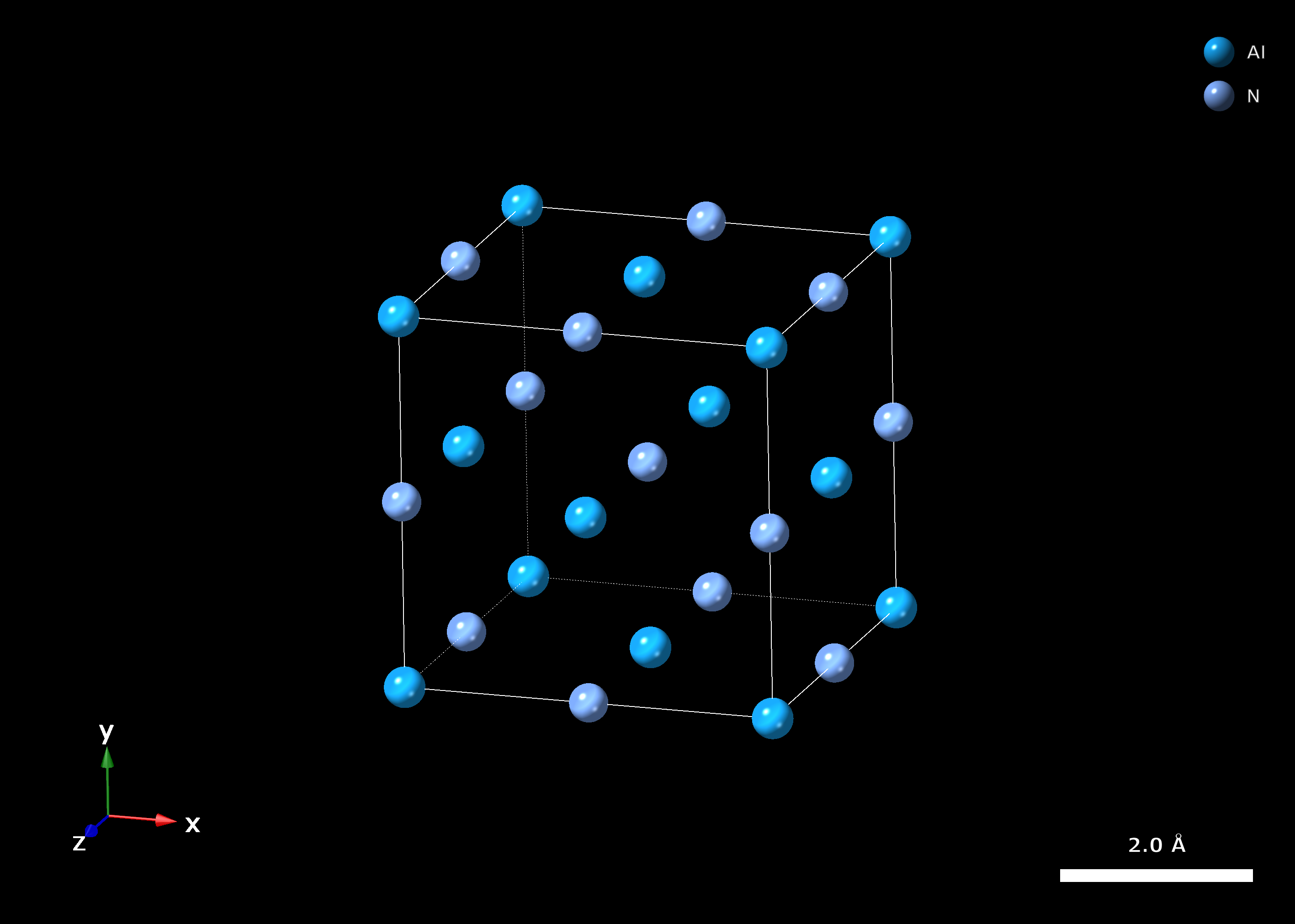
The metastable cubic structure of AlN crystal

In the pure (undoped) state, AlN exhibits very low electrical conductivity, typically in the range of 10^{−11}–10^{−13} Ω^{−1}⋅cm^{−1}, which can increase to 10^{−5}–10^{−6} Ω^{−1}⋅cm^{−1} upon intentional doping. Electrical breakdown occurs at high electric fields on the order of 1×10^{5} V/mm (dielectric strength), reflecting the material's wide band gap and strong chemical bonding.

One of the most distinctive intrinsic properties of wurtzite AlN is its spontaneous polarization, which arises from the non-centrosymmetric nature of the crystal structure and the strong ionic character of the Al-N bonds. The large difference in electronegativity between aluminium and nitrogen results in a substantial polarization along the c-axis.

Compared with other III-nitride materials, AlN has a larger spontaneous polarization due to the higher nonideality of its crystal structure (P_{sp}: AlN 0.081 C/m^{2} > InN 0.032 C/m^{2} > GaN 0.029 C/m^{2}).

In addition, its piezoelectric nature gives rise to significant strain-induced polarization charges under lattice mismatch or external stress. These polarization effects can induce high densities of free carriers at III-nitride heterostructure interfaces without the need for intentional doping. In AlN-based heterostructures, these polarization-induced charges can give rise to a two-dimensional electron gas (2DEG) confined at the interface, enabling high carrier densities without intentional doping. Such polarization-induced 2DEGs are widely exploited in III-nitride electronic devices, particularly high-electron-mobility transistors.

Critical spontaneous and piezoelectric polarization constants for AlN are listed in the table below:

Critical spontaneous and piezoelectric polarization constants for AlN
	e_{31} (C/m^{2})	e_{33} (C/m^{2})	c_{13} (GPa)	c_{33} (GPa)	a_{0} (Å)	c_{0} (Å)
AlN	-0.60	1.46	108	373	3.112	4.982

Owing to the absence of inversion symmetry along the polar direction, AlN thin films can be grown with either metal-polar or nitrogen-polar orientation, with bulk and surface properties that depend sensitively on the chosen polarity. Metal-polar (Al-polar) AlN refers to films grown with the surface terminated by aluminium atoms along the [0001] direction, whereas nitrogen-polar (N-polar) AlN corresponds to films terminated by nitrogen atoms along the opposite [000-1] direction.

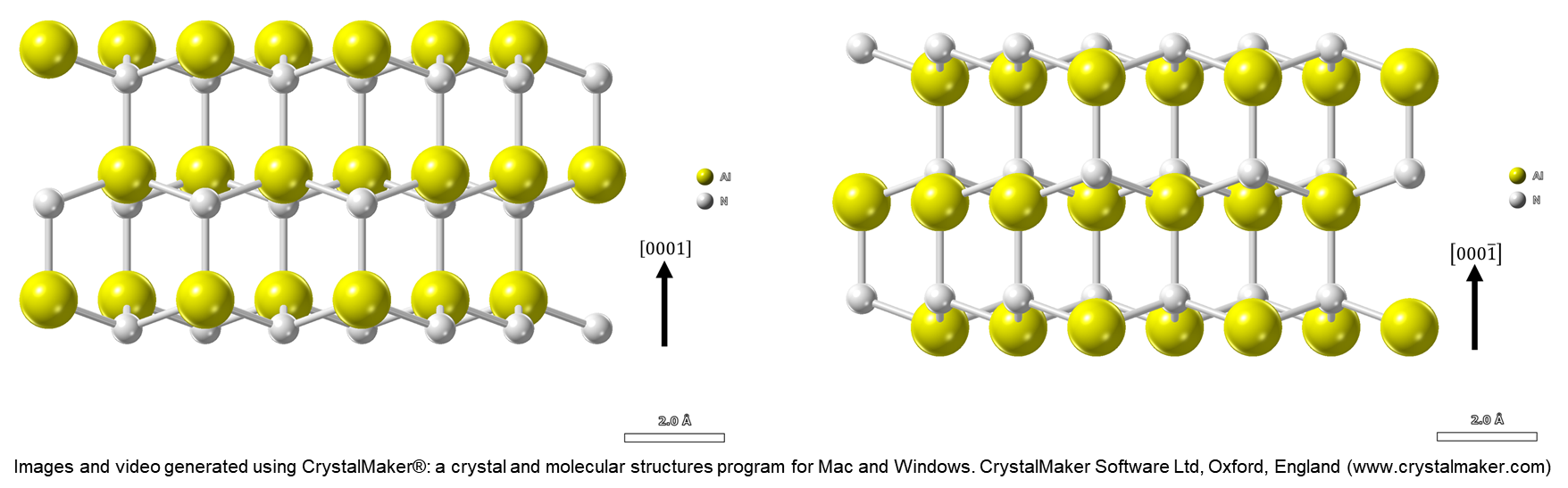
Crystal structures of metal-polar and nitrogen-polar wurtzite AlN

Differences in surface termination lead to distinct surface bonding configurations and chemical reactivities, which can strongly influence epitaxial growth behavior and interface properties. As a result, the roles of polarization and polarity in determining the physical and electronic behavior of AlN remain an active area of research.

AlN has high thermal conductivity. High-quality MOCVD-grown AlN single crystal has an intrinsic thermal conductivity of 321 W/(m·K), consistent with a first-principles calculations. For an electrically insulating ceramic, it is 70–210 W/(m·K) for polycrystalline material, and as high as 285 W/(m·K) for single crystals.

AlN is one of the few materials that have both a wide and direct band gap (almost twice that of SiC and GaN) and large thermal conductivity. This is due to its small atomic mass, strong interatomic bonds, and simple crystal structure. This property makes AlN attractive for applications in high speed and high power communication networks. Many devices handle and manipulate large amounts of energy in small volumes and at high speeds. Hence, due to its electrically insulating nature and high thermal conductivity, AlN is a potential material for high-power power electronics. Among group III-nitride materials, AlN has a higher thermal conductivity compared to gallium nitride (GaN). Therefore, AlN is more advantageous than GaN in terms of heat dissipation in many power and radio frequency electronic devices.

Thermal expansion is another critical property for high temperature applications. The calculated thermal expansion coefficients of AlN at 300 K are 4.2×10^{−6} K^{−1}along a-axis and 5.3×10^{−6} K^{−1} along c-axis.

== Stability and chemical properties ==
Aluminium nitride is stable at high temperatures in inert atmospheres and melts at about 2,200 °C (2,470 K; 3,990 °F). In a vacuum, AlN decomposes at ~1,800 °C (2,070 K; 3,270 °F). In the air, surface oxidation occurs above 700 °C (973 K; 1,292 °F), and even at room temperature, surface oxide layers of 5–10 nm thickness have been detected. This oxide layer protects the material up to 1,370 °C (1,640 K; 2,500 °F). Above this temperature bulk oxidation occurs. Aluminium nitride is stable in hydrogen and carbon-dioxide atmospheres up to 980 °C (1,250 K; 1,800 °F).

The material dissolves slowly in mineral acids through grain-boundary attack and in strong alkalies through attack on the aluminium-nitride grains. The material hydrolyzes slowly in water. Aluminium nitride is resistant to attack from most molten salts, including chlorides and cryolite.

Aluminium nitride can be patterned with a Cl_{2}-based reactive ion etch.

== Synthesis ==
=== Bulk substrate ===
Bulk aluminum nitride (AlN) single crystals are primarily produced to serve as native substrates for III-nitride electronic and optoelectronic devices. Due to the extremely high melting point of AlN (above 2800 °C) and its thermal decomposition before melting under ambient pressure (ambient pressure), conventional melt growth techniques are not applicable. As a result, bulk AlN crystals are fabricated almost exclusively by high-temperature vapor-phase growth methods, with Physical vapor deposition (PVD), also referred to as sublimation growth, being the most established technique, which can be written as:

(AlN)_{solid} → Al _{vapour} + 1/2 N _{2} → (AlN)_{solid}

The solid AlN source material used for sublimation growth is typically prepared by carbothermal reduction–nitridation of alumina for producing AlN powders：

Al_{2}O_{3} + 3C + N_{2} → 2AlN + 3CO

=== Metal-organic vapour phase epitaxy ===
Metalorganic vapour-phase epitaxy is widely used for the epitaxial growth of aluminum nitride (AlN). Early studies focused on thin AlN buffer layers to enable high-quality GaN growth on lattice-mismatched substrates such as sapphire. Aluminum-containing metal–organic precursors, most commonly trimethylaluminum (TMA, Al(CH_{3})_{3}) and triethylaluminum (TEA, Al_{2}(C_{2}H_{5})_{6}) are transported into a heated reaction chamber together with ammonia (NH_{3}) as the nitrogen source, typically using hydrogen as a carrier gas. At elevated substrate temperatures (≈1000–1200 °C), these precursors decompose and react near the substrate surface to form crystalline AlN films. The reactions between TMA and NH_{3} include two steps:

1. the formation of the solid addition compound:

Al_{2}(CH_{3})_{6} (g)+2NH_{3}(g)→2Al(CH_{3})_{3} :NH_{3}(s)

2. the pyrolysis of this addition compound on the heated substrate:

Al(CH_{3})_{3} :NH_{3}(s) → (AlN)(s)+3CH_{4}(g)

=== Molecular beam epitaxy ===
Molecular beam epitaxy (MBE), particularly plasma-assisted MBE (PAMBE), is another technique used for the growth of aluminum nitride thin films, offering precise control over growth conditions and interface abruptness. In MBE, elemental aluminum is supplied from an effusion cell (Knudsen cell), while active nitrogen species are generated using a radio-frequency nitrogen plasma source. Growth is typically carried out under ultra-high vacuum conditions.

High-quality single-crystalline AlN generally requires growth temperatures above approximately 700 °C to ensure sufficient surface diffusion of aluminum adatoms. At lower temperatures, aluminum adatom mobility is reduced, leading to polycrystalline or partially amorphous AlN films. Despite the reduced crystallinity, low-temperature AlN grown by MBE has found applications as an in-situ surface passivation layer in III-nitride high-electron-mobility transistor (HEMTs). The fundamental surface reaction in PAMBE-grown AlN can be expressed as the direct combination of aluminum atoms with activated nitrogen species:

Al(g)+N* (g) → (AlN)(s)

=== Nanopowders ===
Aluminum nitride (AlN) powders is synthesized by the carbothermal reduction of aluminium oxide in the presence of gaseous nitrogen or ammonia or by direct nitridation of aluminium. The use of sintering aids, such as Y_{2}O_{3} or CaO, and hot pressing is required to produce a dense technical-grade material.

== Applications ==
Epitaxially grown thin film crystalline AlN is used for surface acoustic wave sensors (SAWs) deposited on silicon wafers because of AlN's piezoelectric properties. A 2023 paper notes that recent advancements in material science have permitted the deposition of piezoelectric AlN films on polymeric substrates, thus enabling the development of flexible SAW devices. One application is an RF filter, widely used in mobile phones, which is called a thin-film bulk acoustic resonator (FBAR). This is a MEMS device that uses aluminium nitride sandwiched between two metal layers.

AlN is also used to build piezoelectric micromachined ultrasonic transducers, which emit and receive ultrasound and which can be used for in-air rangefinding over distances of up to a meter.

Metallization methods are available to allow AlN to be used in electronics applications similar to those of alumina and beryllium oxide. AlN nanotubes as inorganic quasi-one-dimensional nanotubes, which are isoelectronic with carbon nanotubes, have been suggested as chemical sensors for toxic gases.

Currently there is much research into developing light-emitting diodes to operate in the ultraviolet using gallium nitride based semiconductors and, using the alloy aluminium gallium nitride, wavelengths as short as 250 nm have been achieved. In 2006, an inefficient AlN LED emission at 210 nm was reported.

AlN-based high electron mobility transistors (HEMTs) have attracted a high level of attention due to AlN's superior properties, such as better thermal management, reduced buffer leakage, and excellent integration for all nitride electronics. AlN buffer layer is a critical building block for AlN-based HEMTs, and it has been grown by using metalorganic vapour-phase epitaxy (MOVPE) or molecular beam epitaxy (MBE) on different substrates. Common substrates used for the epitaxial growth of AlN thin films include c-plane sapphire and silicon carbide. Bulk AlN substrates that would permit homoepitaxial growth are of limited availability. Under ambient pressure AlN decomposes at temperatures below its melting point. As a result, conventional melt-boule techniques are not suitable for producing bulk AlN. Building on top of AlN buffer, n-channel devices with 2D electron gas (2DEG) and p-channel devices with 2D hole gas (2DHG) have been demonstrated. The combination of high-density 2DEG and 2DHG on the same semiconductor platform makes it a potential candidate for CMOS devices.

Aluminum nitride ceramics are also used in microwave applications as a substrate and heat sink. More researchers are examining the production of light-emitting diodes(LEDs) to operate in the ultraviolet region using aluminium gallium nitride(AlGaN) based semiconductors.

Among the applications of AlN are

- opto-electronics,
- dielectric layers in optical storage media,
- electronic substrates, chip carriers where high thermal conductivity is essential,
- military applications,
- as a crucible to grow crystals of gallium arsenide,
- steel and semiconductor manufacturing.

== See also ==
- Boron nitride
- Aluminium phosphide
- Aluminium arsenide
- Aluminium antimonide
- Gallium nitride
- Indium nitride
- Aluminium oxynitride
- Titanium aluminium nitride, TiAlN or AlTiN

== Cited sources ==
- Haynes, William M., ed. (2016). CRC Handbook of Chemistry and Physics (97th ed.). CRC Press. p. 4.45. ISBN 978-1-4987-5429-3.
