= Wen-mei Hwu =

American computer scientist

- 胡文美
- Education: National Taiwan University (BS); University of California, Berkeley (PhD)
- Awards: Grace Murray Hopper Award; IEEE Fellow; ACM Fellow; IEEE Computer Society Charles Babbage Award; Eckert-Mauchly Award
- Scientific career
- Fields: Computer science
- Workplaces: NVIDIA Corporation; University of Illinois, Urbana-Champaign
- Thesis: HPSm: Exploiting concurrency to achieve high performance in a single-chip microarchitecture (1987)
- Doctoral advisor: Yale Patt
- Doctoral students: Tom Conte

Wen-mei Hwu (Chinese: 胡文美; pinyin: Hú Wénměi) is a Taiwanese-American computer scientist. He is the Senior Director of Research and Senior Distinguished Research Scientist at NVIDIA Corporation as well as the Walter J. Sanders III-AMD Endowed Chair Professor Emeritus in Electrical and Computer Engineering at the University of Illinois at Urbana-Champaign.

== Biography ==
Hwu earned a bachelor's degree in electrical engineering from National Taiwan University in 1983. He then completed in 1987 a Ph.D. at the University of California, Berkeley, under Yale Patt. Their CPU microarchitecture projects, HPS and HPSm were the predecessors of the form of out-of-order execution that became commercially successful with the Intel P6. For his contributions to the areas of compiler optimization and computer architecture, he received the 1993 Eta Kappa Nu Outstanding Young Electrical Engineer Award, the 1994 Xerox Award for Faculty Research, the 1994 University Scholar Award of the University of Illinois, the 1997 Eta Kappa Nu Holmes MacDonald Outstanding Teaching Award, the 1998 ACM SigArch Maurice Wilkes Award, the 1999 ACM Grace Murray Hopper Award, the 2001 Tau Beta Pi Daniel C. Drucker Eminent Faculty Award, and the 2024 Eckert–Mauchly Award. He served as the Franklin Woeltge Distinguished Professor of Electrical and Computer Engineering from 2000 to 2004. He is a fellow of IEEE and ACM.

His research is on computer architecture, computer microarchitecture, and parallel processing. He is a principal investigator for the petascale Blue Waters supercomputer, is co-director of the Universal Parallel Computing Research Center (UPCRC), and is principal investigator for the first NVIDIA CUDA Center of Excellence at UIUC. At the Illinois Coordinated Science Lab, Hwu leads the IMPACT Research Group and is director of the OpenIMPACT project – which has delivered new compiler and computer architecture technologies to the computer industry since 1987. From 1997 to 1999, Hwu served as the chairman of the Computer Engineering Program at Illinois. Since 2009, Hwu has served as chief technology officer at MulticoreWare Inc., leading the development of compiler tools for heterogeneous platforms. The OpenCL compilers developed by his team at MulticoreWare are based on the LLVM framework and have been deployed by leading semiconductor companies. In 2020, Hwu retired after serving 33 years in University of Illinois at Urbana-Champaign. Currently, Hwu is a Senior Distinguished Research Scientist at Nvidia Research and Emeritus Professor at University of Illinois at Urbana-Champaign.

== Current Research Affiliations ==
- Wen-mei Hwu NVIDIA Research
- IBM-Illinois Center for Cognitive Computing Systems Research
- Blue Waters Project at the National Center for Supercomputing Applications (NCSA)
- IMPACT Research Group at the Coordinated Science Lab
- Concurrent Theme for the Gigascale Systems Research Center
- CUDA Center of Excellence at Illinois

== See also ==
- Wen-mei Hwu's Homepage
- Parallel Computing Research at Illinois: The UPCRC Agenda
- Parallel@Illinois
- Electrical and Computing Engineering at Illinois
- First Virtual School on Computational Science and Engineering: GPUs and Multicores - led by Wen-mei Hwu and David Kirk (Summer 2008)
- University of Illinois NVIDIA CUDA Course taught by Wen-mei Hwu and David Kirk (9 March 2007)
- Wen-mei Hwu: Chief Technology Officer, MulticoreWare Inc.
- Wen-mei Hwu Receives the ACM-IEEE CS Eckert-Mauchly Award
