= S-PULSE =

S-PULSE is the acronym of Shrink-Path of Ultra-Low Power Superconducting Electronics. S-PULSE is a support action of the European Seventh Framework Programme (FP7) that stimulates joint efforts of European academic and industrial groups in the field of superconducting technologies. The general goal is to prepare Superconductor Electronics (SE) technologies for the technology generation beyond the CMOS scaling limits (called often “beyond CMOS”). S-PULSE supports the Superconducting Electronics community to strengthen the vital link between research and development and industry. It also strengthens the exchange of knowledge and ideas and take charge of education.

The challenge in SE is to achieve superconducting electronic circuit performance beyond the possibilities of semiconductor circuit technologies, and to make SE technologies ready to benefit to other technologies in the world markets. This support action, developed in the 2008-2010 period, is focused to prepare a Technology Roadmap and a Strategic Research Agenda (SRA) to enable the transition from the present scientific oriented network for SE towards an industrially guided European Technology Platform (ETP).
