= International Technology Roadmap for Semiconductors =

Set of documents

The International Technology Roadmap for Semiconductors (ITRS) is a set of documents that was coordinated and organized by Semiconductor Research Corporation and produced by a group of experts in the semiconductor industry. These experts were representative of the sponsoring organisations, including the Semiconductor Industry Associations of Taiwan, South Korea, the United States, Europe, Japan, and China.

As of 2017, ITRS is no longer being updated. Its successor is the International Roadmap for Devices and Systems.

The documents carried disclaimer: "The ITRS is devised and intended for technology assessment only and is without regard to any commercial considerations pertaining to individual products or equipment".

The documents represent best opinion on the directions of research and time-lines up to about 15 years into the future for the following areas of technology:

- System drivers/design
- Test & test equipment
- Front-end processes
- Process integration, devices and structures
- Radio frequency and analog/mixed-signal technologies
- Microelectromechanical systems (MEMS)
- Photolithography
- IC interconnects
- Factory integration
- Assembly & packaging
- Environment, safety & health
- Yield enhancement
- Metrology
- Modeling & simulation
- Emerging research devices
- Emerging research materials

== History ==
Constructing an integrated circuit, or any semiconductor device, requires a series of operations—photolithography, etching, metal deposition, and so on. As the industry evolved, each of these operations were typically performed by specialized machines built by a variety of commercial companies. This specialization may potentially make it difficult for the industry to advance, since in many cases it does no good for one company to introduce a new product if the other needed steps are not available around the same time. A technology roadmap can help this by giving an idea when a certain capability will be needed. Then each supplier can target this date for their piece of the puzzle.

With the progressive externalization of production tools to the suppliers of specialized equipment, participants identified a need for a clear roadmap to anticipate the evolution of the market and to plan and control the technological needs of IC production. For several years, the Semiconductor Industry Association (SIA) gave this responsibility of coordination to the United States, which led to the creation of an American style roadmap, the National Technology Roadmap for Semiconductors (NTRS).

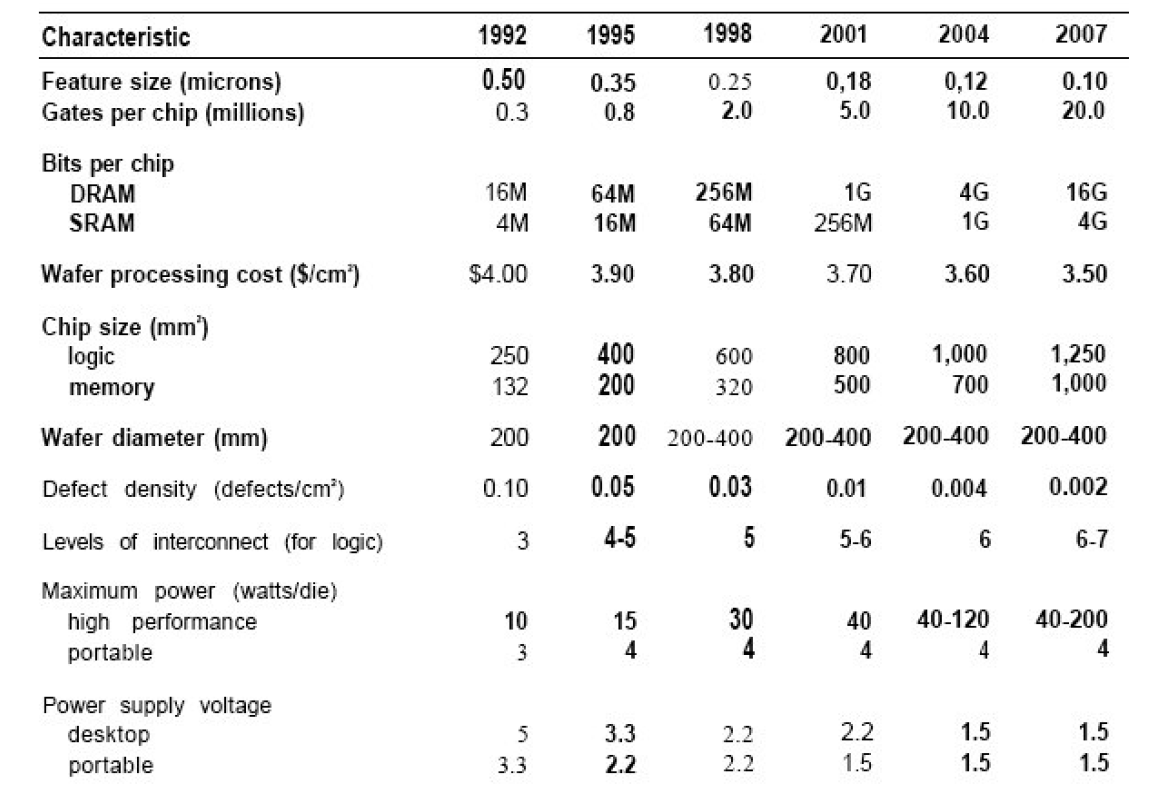
The first semiconductor roadmap, published by the SIA in 1993.

In 1998, the SIA became closer to its European, Japanese, Korean, and Taiwanese counterparts by creating the first global roadmap: The International Technology Roadmap for Semiconductors (ITRS). This international group has (as of the 2003 edition) 936 companies which were affiliated with working groups within the ITRS. The organization was divided into Technical Working Groups (TWGs) which eventually grew in number to 17, each focusing on a key element of the technology and associated supply chain. Traditionally, the ITRS roadmap was updated in even years, and completely revised in odd years.

The last revision of the ITRS Roadmap was published in 2013. The methodology and the physics behind the scaling results for 2013 tables is described in transistor roadmap projection using predictive full-band atomistic modeling which covers double gate MOSFETs over the 15 years to 2028.

With the generally acknowledged sunsetting of Moore's law and, ITRS issuing in 2016 its final roadmap, a new initiative for a more generalized roadmapping was started through the IEEE's Rebooting Computing initiative, named the International Roadmap for Devices and Systems (IRDS).

== ITRS 2.0 ==
In April 2014, the ITRS committee announced it would be reorganizing the ITRS roadmap to better suit the needs of the industry. The plan was to take all the elements included in the 17 technical working groups and map them into seven focus topics:

- System integration
  This is a design-focused topic that examines architectures, and how to integrate heterogeneous blocks.
  Outside system connectivity
  Focuses on wireless technologies, how they work, and how to choose the best solution.
  Heterogeneous integration
  The focus will be on integration of separately manufactured technologies into a new unit so that they function better than the individual pieces do separately - whilst allowing for components such as cameras and microphones.
  Heterogeneous components
  Focuses on different devices that form heterogeneous systems, such as MEMS, power generation, and sensing devices.
  Beyond CMOS
  The focus is on devices that provide electronics but aren’t CMOS based, such as spintronics, memristors, and others.
  More Moore
  Because there is still work to be done, this group will take on the continued shrinking of CMOS.
  Factory integration
  Focus will be on the new tools and processes to produce heterogeneous integration of all these things.

Chapters on each topic were published in 2015.
