= Indium gallium aluminium nitride =

Indium gallium aluminium nitride (InGaAlN, AlInGaN) is a GaN-based compound semiconductor. It is usually prepared by epitaxial growth methods such as metalorganic chemical vapour deposition (MOCVD). This material is used for specialist opto-electronics applications, including laser diodes and LEDs with wavelengths from the UV to green regions of the optical spectrum.

== See also ==
- Indium aluminium nitride
