= IEEE Cloud Computing =

- Founded: April 2011
- Type: Professional Organization
- Purpose: Cloud Computing, Big Data
- Location: Piscataway, New Jersey
- Origins: Global initiative launched by IEEE
- Region served: Worldwide
- Method: Communications, Conferences, Digital Media, Education, Industry standards, Marketing, Publications, Testbed, Web Portal
- Key people: Steve Diamond, Chair; Kathy Grise, Program Director
- Website: cloudcomputing.ieee.org

IEEE Cloud Computing is a global initiative launched by IEEE to promote cloud computing, big data and related technologies, and to provide expertise and resources to individuals and enterprises involved in cloud computing.

== History ==
In 2010, the Institute of Electrical and Electronics Engineers (IEEE) sponsored two cloud computing–specific conferences: IEEE CLOUD and IEEE CloudCom. With the success of the two conferences, IEEE Senior Member and IEEE Computer Society past president Steve Diamond, began urging the organization to take an active role in the development of cloud computing standards.

In April 2011, with the support of the IEEE Future Directions Committee and funding from the IEEE New Initiatives Committee, IEEE Cloud Computing was launched. The initiative was designed to follow a multi-year plan and includes a focus across multiple tracks: conferences, education, publications, standards, Intercloud Testbed, web portal, marketing, and public relations.

As part of the initiative's launch, two new cloud computing standards development projects were approved: IEEE P2301, Draft Guide for Cloud Portability and Interoperability Profile, and IEEE P2302, Draft Standard for Intercloud Interoperability and Federation (SIIF). With a growing need for greater cloud computing interoperability and federation, IEEE Cloud Computing focused its development activities and resources behind IEEE P2302 standard.

== Current work ==
IEEE Cloud Computing continues to pursue efforts to provide cloud computing standards, advancement of cloud computing technologies, and to educate users on the benefits of cloud computing. As part of this ongoing effort, it offers a variety of activities, products, and services, including the IEEE Cloud Computing portal, conferences and events, continuing education courses, publications, standards, and the IEEE Intercloud Testbed platform for testing cloud computing interoperability.

=== IEEE Cloud Computing web portal ===
The IEEE Cloud Computing portal serves as an online hub for cloud computing resources. The site includes news and information in the form of IEEE press releases, as well as articles taken from both IEEE and third-party publications. The portal provides dedicated sections for conferences and events, education and careers, publications, standards, the IEEE Intercloud Testbed, and other innovations.

=== Standards ===
As part of its mandate, IEEE Cloud Computing is in the process of developing global cloud computing standards. In April 2011, it began working on the first IEEE cloud computing standards, IEEE P2301 and IEEE P2302. Both IEEE P2301, Draft Guide for Cloud Portability and Interoperability Profile, and IEEE P2302, Draft Standard for Intercloud Interoperability and Federation address cloud interoperability, portability, and fragmentation.

The IEEE P2301 Guide for Cloud Portability and Interoperability Profiles (CPIP) Working Group was formed on February 24, 2014, with a mandate to develop the Guide for Cloud Portability and Interoperability Profiles. When completed, the guide will advise cloud computing ecosystem participants such as cloud vendors, service providers, and end users about available standards-based choices in areas like application, portability, management, and interoperability interfaces; file formats; and operation conventions. The guide will group these choices into multiple logical profiles, organized to address different cloud personalities. John Messina, senior member of the National Institute of Standards and Technology (NIST) cloud computing program, is the Chair of the IEEE P2301 Guide for Cloud Portability and Interoperability Profiles Working Group.

On April 4, 2011, the IEEE P2302 Draft Standard for Intercloud Interoperability and Federation Working Group was formed. When finalized and approved, IEEE P2302 will define topology, protocols, functionality, and governance for cloud-to-cloud interoperability and federated operations

IEEE Cloud Computing also formed its new IEEE Adaptive Management for Cloud Computing (AMCC) Study Group on December 16, 2013. The group's purpose is to investigate the management environments needed to support the dynamic nature of cloud computing environments, the services they provide, the customers that consume the services and the providers offering the services. It will also explore potential application for adaptive, policy-based management in cloud based environments, including adaptive management architectures and environments; adaptive security management; auto-generation of management policies from business specifications; auto-generation of data in support of management functionality; and co-generation of application and management functionality. Joel Fleck, senior standards architect at HP Labs is the study group's chair.

=== Conferences ===
IEEE Cloud Computing both sponsors and participates in cloud computing-focused conferences and events around the world. Designed to promote knowledge-sharing about cloud computing, events typically range from one day to a week or more and attract a global audience. Conference and event programs generally offer multiple educational tracks with keynote speeches, panel discussions, and roundtables led by industry notables, researchers, engineers, academics, policymakers, and other key stakeholders.

In early January 2012, IEEE Cloud Computing began partnering with established conference to develop a matrix of events targeted to specific geographic regions. IEEE GLOBECOM 2013, held in Atlanta, Georgia, was co-located with the North America Cloud Congress. The initiative is organizing additional Cloud Congresses in the European, Asia Pacific, and Latin America regions to encourage greater focus on cloud computing via existing, well-established conference such as IEEE Signature Conference on Computers, Software, and Applications (COMPSAC), IEEE International Conference on Cloud Computing Technology and Science (IEEE CloudCom), and IEEE Global Communications Conference, Exhibition, and Industry Forum (GLOBECOM), or to create new cloud computing-related events in specific geographic regions.

==== IEEE Cloud Computing conferences and events ====
- IEEE CloudCom: Also sponsored by IEEE Computer Society, IEEE CloudCom was first held at Beijing Jiaotong University, China in 2009, CloudCom addresses technical and scientific issues related to cloud computing, including architecture, data, security and privacy, and services and applications.
- IEEE CLOUD: Sponsored by IEEE Computer Society and launched in Los Angeles, California, the international IEEE CLOUD conference was originally co-located with the 2009 World Congress on Services. The event focuses on cloud computing technologies, advancements, and innovations.
- IEEE Cloud Computing for Emerging Markets (IEEE CCEM): The first major conference organized by IEEE Cloud Computing, the inaugural IEEE CCEM conference was held in Bangalore, India in October 2012. IEEE CCEM focuses on challenges and opportunities of cloud computing in emerging markets. Notable speakers at the first conference included Dr. Fausto Bernardini, IBM; Dr. Anand Deshpande, Persistent Systems; Manish Israni, Vodafone India; Gautham Mago, Sequoia Capital India; Sam Pitroda, Chairman of India's National Innovation Council; and Dr. Anurag Srivastava of Wipro.
- IEEE CloudNet: A new conference launched in 2012 in Paris, France, IEEE CloudNet is specific to cloud networking and related technologies.
- IEEE Annual International Computers, Software & Applications Conference (IEEE COMPSAC): First held in 1977 in Chicago, Illinois, IEEE COMPSAC is an annual international conference focusing on computers, software, and applications, including cloud computing. Conference programs address research results, advancements and future trends in computer and software technologies and applications through keynote addresses, panel discussions, workshops, and doctoral symposiums.
- IEEE Global Communications Conference (IEEE GLOBECOM): One of two IEEE Communications Society's (IEEE ComSoc) flagship conferences, IEEE GLOBECOM addresses an array of telecommunications technologies and disciplines, including broadband, wireless, satellite, social networking, and cloud computing. The conference attracts scientists, researchers and industry practitioners.

=== Education ===
IEEE Cloud Computing offers continuing education courses, e-learning modules, and videos of conference, section, and chapter talks.

== Participating organizations ==
Participating societies and organizations active in the IEEE Cloud Computing include:

- Biometrics Council
- Communications Society
- Computational Intelligence Society
- Computer Society
- Consumer Electronics Society
- Control Systems Society
- Educational Activities
- IEEE.tv
- IEEE Standards Association
- Photonics Society
- Power & Energy Society
- Reliability Society
- Signal Processing Society
- Sensors Council
- Systems Council
- Systems, Man, and Cybernetics Society
- Technical Activities
- Vehicular Technology Society
