= Cryoelectronics =

In electronics, cryoelectronics or cryolectronics is the study of superconductivity under cryogenic conditions and its applications. It is also described as the operation of power electronic devices at cryogenic temperatures. Practical applications of this field is quite broad, although it is particularly useful in areas where cryogenic environment exists such as superconducting technologies and spacecraft design. It also became a special branch of cryophysics and cryotechnics and plays a role in operations that require high resolution and precision measurements.

Cryoelectronic devices include SQUIDs or superconducting quantum interference devices, which represent magnetic sensors of highest sensitivity. They serve as the backbone of applications that range from materials evaluation, geological and environmental prospecting, and medical diagnostics, among others.

== Marketable Uses ==
A key factor in production of new technologies is whether it is cost effective and useful. Devices that make use of cryoelectronics and the applications of superconductivity such as computers, information transmission lines, and magnetocardiography have potential for commercial value outside of a few specific devices for singular purposes. At the same time, the presence of other devices made with highly specialized functions can be competitively marketed without having to rely on a large market.

- Devices and activities that are derived from this and have marketable functions include:
- Magnetometry: this includes magnetocardiography, communications, geomagnetism, and submarine detection. This includes several more specialized functions and some broader functions that can be derived from cryoelectronics.
- Computers: being able to mass-produce cheap, compact tunneling cryotron provides a diverse base of uses and marketing.
- Electrical Metrology: Allowing for more precise readings and measurements of current, voltage, power, and attenuation ratio, this will allow for more precise control over maintaining legal levels which provides a specific need and use for the technology.
- Galvanometers: a range of measurement devices that will be of use to the scientific field though more precise measurements in specialized fields.
