= Indium nitride =

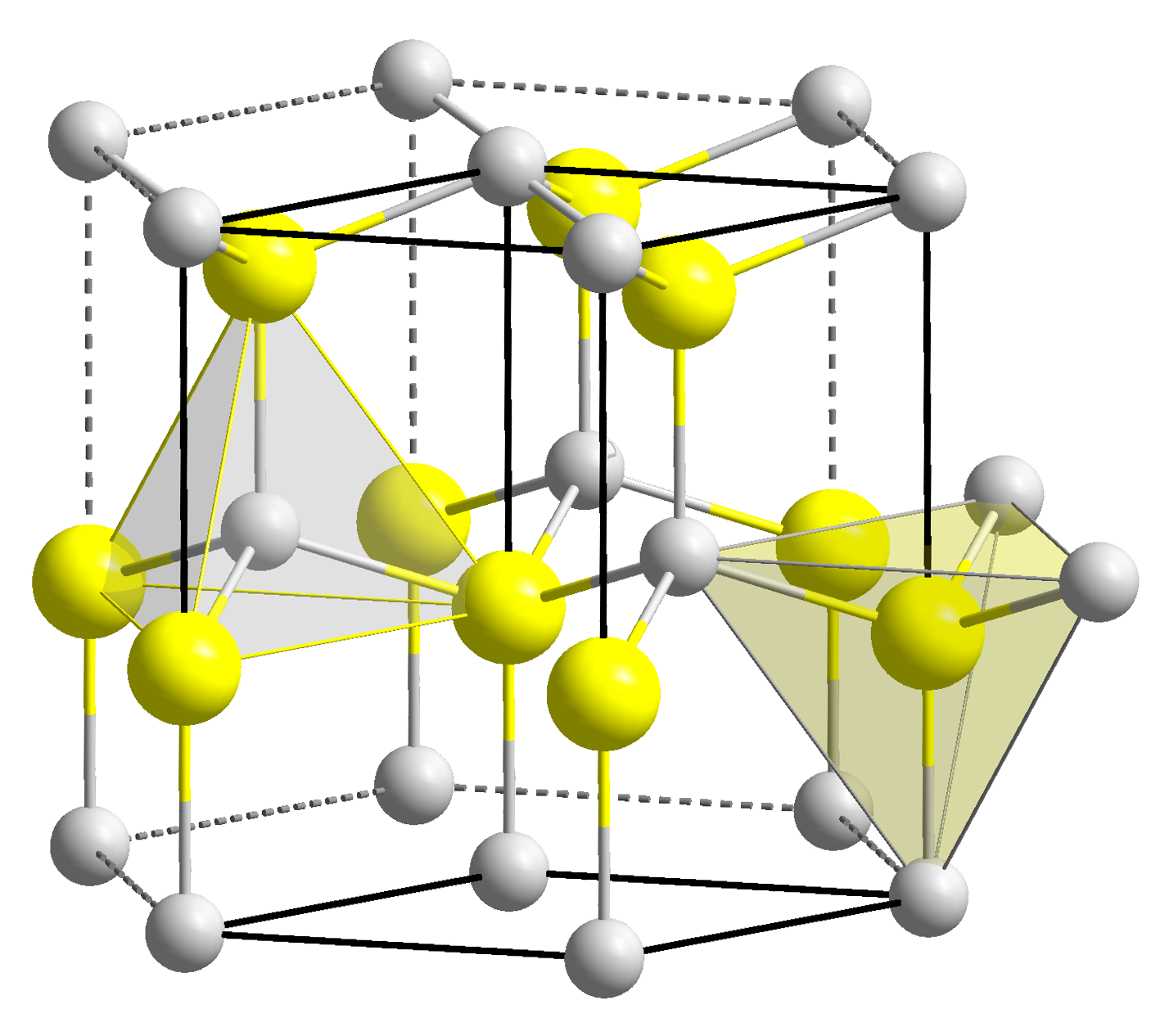

Names
- Other names Indium(III) nitride

Identifiers
CAS Number	25617-98-5
3D model (JSmol)	Interactive image; Interactive image
ChemSpider	105058
ECHA InfoCard	100.042.831
PubChem CID	117560
UNII	D66UAC005A
CompTox Dashboard (EPA)	DTXSID7067112
- InChI: InChI=1S/In.N Key: NWAIGJYBQQYSPW-UHFFFAOYSA-N; InChI=1/In.N/rInN/c1-2 Key: NWAIGJYBQQYSPW-QCNKTVRGAR
- SMILES: [In+3].[N-3]; [In]#N

Properties
Chemical formula	InN
Molar mass	128.825 g·mol^{−1}
Appearance	black powder
Density	6.81 g/cm^{3}
Melting point	1,100 °C (2,010 °F; 1,370 K)
Solubility in water	hydrolysis
Band gap	0.65 eV (300 K)
Electron mobility	3200 cm^{2}/(V.s) (300 K)
Thermal conductivity	45 W/(m⋅K) (300 K)
Refractive index (n_{D})	2.9

Structure
Crystal structure	Wurtzite (hexagonal)
Space group	C^{4}_{6v}-P6_{3}mc
Lattice constant	a = 354.5 pm, c = 570.3 pm
Coordination geometry	Tetrahedral

Hazards
- Occupational safety and health (OHS/OSH)
Main hazards	Irritant, hydrolysis to ammonia
Safety data sheet (SDS)	External SDS

Related compounds
Other anions	Indium phosphide Indium arsenide Indium antimonide
Other cations	Boron nitride Aluminium nitride Gallium nitride
Related compounds	Indium gallium nitride Indium gallium aluminium nitride
- Except where otherwise noted, data are given for materials in their standard state (at 25 °C [77 °F], 100 kPa). verify (what is ?) Infobox references

Indium nitride (InN) is a small-bandgap semiconductor material, which has potential application in solar cells and high speed electronics.

The bandgap of InN has now been established as ~0.7 eV depending on temperature (the obsolete value is 1.97 eV). The effective electron mass has been recently determined by high magnetic field measurements, m* = 0.055 m_{0}.

Alloyed with GaN, the ternary system InGaN has a direct bandgap span from the infrared (0.69 eV) to the ultraviolet (3.4 eV).

Currently there is research into developing solar cells using the nitride based semiconductors. Using one or more alloys of indium gallium nitride (InGaN), an optical match to the solar spectrum can be achieved. The bandgap of InN allows a wavelengths as long as 1900 nm to be utilized. However, there are many difficulties to be overcome if such solar cells are to become a commercial reality: p-type doping of InN and indium-rich InGaN is one of the biggest challenges. Heteroepitaxial growth of InN with other nitrides (GaN, AlN) has proved to be difficult.

Thin layers of InN can be grown using metalorganic chemical vapour deposition (MOCVD).

== Uses ==
It has been shown that InN can be used to improve efficiency of superfast fibre-optic broadband, by using thin films of the material to enable fast switching in semiconductors.

== Superconductivity ==
Thin polycrystalline films of indium nitride can be highly conductive and even superconductive at liquid helium temperatures. The superconducting transition temperature T_{c} depends on each sample's film structure and carrier density and varies from 0 K to about 3 K. With magnesium doping, the T_{c} can be 3.97 K. The superconductivity persists under high magnetic field (few teslas), that differs from superconductivity in In metal which is quenched by fields of only 0.03 tesla. Nevertheless, the superconductivity is attributed to metallic indium chains or nanoclusters, where the small size increases the critical magnetic field according to the Ginzburg–Landau theory.

== See also ==
- Indium(III) oxide
- Indium phosphide
