= International Roadmap for Devices and Systems =

Predictions on future electronic developments

The International Roadmap for Devices and Systems (IRDS) is a set of predictions about likely developments in electronic devices and systems. The IRDS was established in 2016 and is the successor to the International Technology Roadmap for Semiconductors. These predictions are intended to allow coordination of efforts across academia, manufacturers, equipment suppliers, and national research laboratories. The IEEE specifies the goals of the roadmap as:

- Identifying key trends related to devices, systems, and all related technologies by generating a roadmap with a 15-year horizon
- Determining generic devices and systems needs, challenges, potential solutions, and opportunities for innovation.
- Encouraging related activities world-wide through collaborative events such as related IEEE conferences and roadmap workshops

The executive committee is drawn from regions with a major stake in developments in electronics: Europe, South Korea, Japan, Taiwan, and the United States.

International Focus Teams (IFTs) assess present status and future evolution of the ecosystem in their specific field of expertise and produce a 15-year roadmap. IFT reports includes evolution, key challenges, major roadblocks, and possible solutions. IFTs include:

- Application Benchmarking
- Systems and Architectures
- More Moore - further developments in traditional integrated circuits, referring to historical improvements described by Moore's law
- Beyond CMOS - technologies that may allow further progress once CMOS reaches its fundamental limits.
- Packaging Integration
- Outside System Connectivity
- Factory Integration
- Lithography
- Metrology
- Emerging Research Materials
- Environment, Safety, Health, and Sustainability
- Yield Enhancement
- Cryogenic Electronics and Quantum Information Processing (added in 2018)

== See also ==
- International Technology Roadmap for Semiconductors (ITRS)
