= List of laws =

This is a list of "laws" applied to various disciplines. These are often adages or predictions with the appellation 'Law', although they do not apply in the legal sense, cannot be scientifically tested, or are intended only as rough descriptions (rather than applying in each case). These 'laws' are sometimes called rules of thumb.

See List of legal topics for 'laws' in the legal sense.

See List of scientific laws for falsifiable laws that are said to apply universally and literally.

== General ==
- Benford's law
- Hilt's law
- Stigler's law of eponymy
- Goodhart's law

== Astronomy and cosmology ==
- Hubble's law
- Titius–Bode law
- Dermott's law

== Technology ==
- Amdahl's law (maximum possible speed-up to a parallel program when adding more computing power)
- Bell's law of computer classes (corollary to Moore's law for computer class formation)
- Brooks's law
- Conway's law
- Dennard scaling
- Engelbart's law
- Eroom's law
- Godwin's law (Prediction of internet debating patterns)
- Grosch's law
- Gustafson's law
- Haitz's law – analog to Moore's law for LEDs
- Hick's law
- Kryder's law
- Koomey's law
- Landauer's principle
- Linus's law (software development)
- Metcalfe's law
- Moore's law (hardware development)
- Neven's law
- Reed's law
- Swanson's law
- Wirth's law
- Wright's law
- Zimmerman's law

== Economic ==
- Laws of supply and demand
- Gresham's law
- Say's law
- Law of diminishing marginal utility
- Ricardo's law
- Okun's law

== Linguistic ==
- Aitken's Law - synchronic rule in Scottish varieties of English
- Bartholomae's law - regarding historical sound changes in Indo-Iranian
- Bartsch's law - regarding historical sound changes in French
- Brugmann's law - regarding historical sound changes in Indo-Iranian
- Dahl's law - synchronic rule in Bantu languages
- Dorsey's law - synchronic rule in Winnebago
- Grassmann's law - regarding historical sound changes in ancient Greek and Sanskrit
- Grimm's law – regarding historical sound changes in Proto-Germanic
- Hirt's law - regarding historical sound changes in Balto-Slavic
- Osthoff's law - regarding historical sound changes in Indo-European
- Pedersen's law - regarding historical sound changes in Balto-Slavic
- Philippi's law - regarding historical sound changes in Biblical Hebrew
- Verner's law - an exception to Grimm's law
- Wackernagel's law - regarding position of clitics in syntax
- Whorf's law - regarding historical sound changes in Proto-Uto-Aztecan
- Winter's law - regarding historical sound changes in Balto-Slavic

See also Glossary of sound laws in the Indo-European languages

== Mathematical ==
- Associative Law of Addition
- Associative Law of Multiplication
- Commutative law of addition
- Commutative Law of Multiplication
- Distributive laws
- Law of large numbers

== Science fiction authors ==
- Clarke's three laws
- Niven's laws
- Sturgeon's law
- Three Laws of Robotics (Isaac Asimov's fictional set of laws)
- Wizard's First Rule (law)

== Biological ==
- Bergmann's rule
- Llinás' law
- Briffault's law
- Kleiber's law
- Rensch's rule
- Rubner's law

== Related lists ==
- List of eponymous laws
- List of scientific laws named after people
