= Brandolini's law =

Internet adage

Brandolini's law (or the bullshit asymmetry principle) is an Internet adage coined in 2013 by Italian programmer Alberto Brandolini. It contrasts the considerable effort of debunking misinformation with the relative ease of creating it in the first place. The adage states:

The amount of energy needed to refute bullshit is an order of magnitude bigger than that needed to produce it.

The challenge of refuting misinformation does not come just from its time-consuming nature, but also from the challenge of defying and confronting one's community.

== Origins ==
The adage was publicly formulated in January 2013 by Alberto Brandolini, an Italian programmer. Brandolini stated that he was inspired by reading Daniel Kahneman's Thinking, Fast and Slow, right before watching an Italian political talk show involving former Prime Minister Silvio Berlusconi and journalist Marco Travaglio.

== Examples ==
The persistent false claim that vaccines cause autism is sometimes cited as an example of Brandolini's law. In 1998, British anti-vaccine activist Andrew Wakefield wrote a fraudulent research paper which claimed to find a relationship between the MMR vaccine and autism. The article was retracted, and Wakefield's medical license was revoked. Despite extensive investigation showing no such relationship, the false assertion has had a disastrous effect on public health, contributing to vaccine hesitancy. Decades of research, and attempts to educate the public, have failed to eradicate the misinformation.

In 2013, shortly after the Boston Marathon bombing, the claim that a student who had survived the Sandy Hook Elementary School shooting had been killed by the bombing began to spread across social media. Despite many attempts to debunk the rumor, the false story was shared by more than 92,000 people and was covered by major news agencies.

Due to the rapid dissemination of information on social media, people are much more susceptible to becoming victims of pseudo-scientific trends, such as Mehmet Oz's weight loss supplements and Joseph Mercola's tanning beds that were meant to reduce one's risk of developing cancer. Although government agencies were able to prevent further sales of those products, millions of dollars had already been spent by consumers and fans.

Another example dates to 2016, when Iceland's football team eliminated England from the UEFA European Championship. Nine months after the victory, the Icelandic doctor Ásgeir Pétur Thorvaldsson jokingly tweeted that a baby boom in Iceland had occurred due to the victory. Wide media coverage repeated this claim, but statistical analysis proved it false.

=== COVID-19 pandemic ===
In an example of Brandolini's law during the COVID-19 pandemic, Jeff Yates, a disinformation journalist at Radio-Canada, described the experience of debunking a popular YouTube video spreading COVID-19 medical misinformation presented by a pineapple importer: "He makes all kinds of different claims. I had to check every single one of them. I had to call relevant experts and talk to them. I had to transcribe those interviews. I had to write a text that is legible and interesting to read. It's madness. It took this guy 15 minutes to make his video and it took me three days to fact-check."

Analyzing disinformation about the use of hydroxychloroquine for COVID-19 prevention, scientists Jevin West and Carl Bergstrom noted that, even though a promising early clinical trial had since been prominently refuted, the claim that hydroxychloroquine could effectively treat COVID-19 continued to spread rapidly due to a combination of widespread social media coverage, high anxiety, and high uncertainty.

== Further applications ==
In 2020, researchers studied the sensitivity to bullshit and found that, "people are more receptive to bullshit, and less sensitive to detecting bullshit, under conditions in which they possess relatively few self-regulatory resources".

Within the context of scientific analysis, Brandolini's law can be applied to the bullshit being presented and bring the bullshitter under scrutiny as well. When it is revealed that a source repeatedly lied throughout a stretch of scientific research, the bullshitter becomes more obvious than the bullshit itself. Because the bullshitter loses credibility, the ensuing bullshit is easier to identify.

== Mitigation ==
Environmental researcher Phil Williamson of University of East Anglia implored other scientists in 2016 to get online and refute falsehoods to their work whenever possible, despite the difficulty of doing so as described by Brandolini's law. He wrote that, "The scientific process doesn't stop when results are published in a peer-reviewed journal. Wider communication is also involved, and that includes ensuring not only that information (including uncertainties) is understood, but also that misinformation and errors are corrected where necessary." Combating the spreading of misinformation requires scientists to establish the validity and quality of research, stories, and claims with a rating system.

Carl T. Bergstrom and Jevin West, researchers on the topic of bullshit, study how to refute the bullshit that takes a large amount of energy to discover. This complicated process depends on the audience the bullshit is intended to influence, the time and energy a person is willing to invest in this process, and the medium used to do the refuting. In order to refute misinformation, one needs to do the following:

1. Be correct by including all necessary information and double checking that the facts are accurate.
2. Be charitable by acknowledging the possibility of your own confusion, not attributing malice, and not assigning stupidity.
3. Be clear and coherent about the argument you are making.
4. Admit mistakes and faults.

Other techniques for increasing the effectiveness of retracting misinformation include: pre-exposure warnings, repeated retractions, and providing an alternative narrative.

== Similar concepts ==
In a 1710 article in The Examiner, Jonathan Swift said:

Falsehood flies, and truth comes limping after it; so that when men come to be undeceived, it is too late, the jest is over, and the tale has had its effect: like a man who has thought of a good repartee, when the discourse is changed, or the company parted; or, like a physician, who has found out an infallible medicine, after the patient is dead.

Variations on the adage, "A lie can travel halfway around the world before the truth can get its boots on" appeared in publication as early as 1820, when an article in the Portland Gazette stated that, "Falsehood will fly from Maine to Georgia, while truth is pulling her boots on."

In 1845, economist Frédéric Bastiat explained:

We must confess that our adversaries have a marked advantage over us in the discussion. In very few words they can announce a half-truth; and in order to demonstrate that it is incomplete, we are obliged to have recourse to long and dry dissertations.

Prior to Brandolini's adage, Italian blogger Uriel Fanelli and researcher Jonathan Koomey, creator of Koomey's law, shared a related principle in their book Calling Bullshit: The Art of Skepticism in a Data-Driven World: "An idiot can create more bullshit than you could ever hope to refute." In an article on the environmental impacts of cryptocurrency, Koomey stated that, "In fast-changing fields, like information technology, refutations lag nonsense production to a greater degree than in fields with less rapid change."

== See also ==
- Big lie
- Burden of proof
- Hitchens's razor
- List of eponymous laws
- Poe's law
