= Engelbart's law =

Observation that the intrinsic rate of human performance is exponential

Engelbart's law is the observation that the intrinsic rate of human performance is exponential. The law is named after Douglas Engelbart, whose work in augmenting human performance was explicitly based on the realization that although we use technology, the ability to improve on improvements (bootstrapping, "getting better at getting better") resides entirely within the human sphere.

Engelbart's Bootstrapping concept identifies the general, and particular, meaning of the observation with regards to rate and performance: a quantity, amount, or degree of something measured per unit of something else. That is, Engelbart's law is not limited to an increase in the acquisition, or use of, or quantity of knowledge, nor of the extent or depth of participation among individuals or teams, nor of the period-to-period change. The law is independent of the domain of performance and the quantity, amount, or degree on which one chooses a measure.

== Exponential performance ==
Humans have long performed at exponential levels, and in widely varying contexts and domains.

As with other phenomena, when we notice similar results when applying a reagent or catalyst across many contexts and domains, we associate the power to produce or induce those results with the reagent, here the human animal.

Stephen Jay Kline presented an interesting visualization of this exponential phenomenon in his 1995 book. See page 173, figure 14-1. The Growth of Human Powers Over the Past 100,000 Years Plotted as Technoextension Factors (TEFs). The log-log chart (time, TEF) illustrates exponential performance extending over many domains and over hundreds of years.

On this topic Kline's work made heavy use of the work of John H. Lienhard. Kline specifically references Lienhard's The Rate of Technological Improvement before and after the 1830s. Lienhard explored this topic several times at Engines of Our Ingenuity. See specifically Double in a Lifetime. Other relevant episodes include Influence of War, and Influence of War, Updated . In these latter two references Lienhard explores, and discards, the influence of an urgent necessity as a necessary driver to such performance.

In discussing the exponential nature of Moore's law, Gordon Moore locates the roots of his inspiration in Engelbart's observations on the propensity of humans to envision and achieve scale, and its non-linear effects.

== Collective IQ ==
Engelbart labeled Collective IQ as the measure of how well people can work on important problems and opportunities collectively. It is, ultimately, a measure of effectiveness.

It has long been the fashion to talk of human performance as if it were dependent on a particular socio-technology fabric. Yet Engelbart felt that what was important was not the particulars of that fabric, but its nature. He called the nature of that fabric The Bootstrap Paradigm.

Central to his realization was a Dynamic Knowledge Repository (DKR) capable of enabling the concurrent development, integration and application of knowledge (CoDIAK). Such a DKR would itself be subject to the CoDIAK process.

This is a co-evolution of the human system and the tool system. To facilitate this, Engelbart observed that a particular structure of human activities is most useful and natural, the A-level ('Business as Usual'), B-level ('Improving how we do that') and C-level ('Improving how we improve') Activities.

In ABC Model, and particularly Turbo Charge the C Activity and Extra Bootstrapping Engelbart addresses the necessity of the C-level activity in the shift from an incremental improvement curve to an exponential improvement curve.

Whereas B-level activities achieve mildly-exponential results, Engelbart held that C-levels activities are necessary to achieve bootstrapping, improving the improvement, a direct dependence on the intrinsically exponential nature of humans.

== Bootstrap measurement ==
Although Engelbart never published a metric for measuring Bootstrap effects, the Bootstrap Alliance, in 1997, considered, the characteristics of candidate metrics.

As derived from the above, candidate metrics would necessarily:

- Account for the feedback-like results of each of the ABC-level Activities
- Reflect an augmentation of CIQ
- Measure an improved ability to CoDIAK through the use of a DKR
- Capture the amplification of Bootstrapping itself

In addition to the above acronyms, the following represents the performance of ABC-level Activities by their respective letters: $\mathcal{A}, \mathcal{B}, \mathcal{C}$.

=== Insufficient metrics ===
==== Simple compounded rate ====
Candidate metric:

$CIQ_t = \mathcal{A} \left ( 1 + \mathcal{B} \right )^t$	1

Although this metric would reflect the augmentation of CIQ, the efficiency in the concurrent development, integration, and application of knowledge (CoDIAK) would be dependent solely on the application of B-level Activity to A-level Activity. (For example: $CoDIAK_{t \to t+1} = 1 + \mathcal{B}$) There is insufficiently-explicit accounting of improvements to CoDIAK dynamics, and no accounting of C-level Activities.

==== Simple exponential power ====
Although powerful, Engelbart's Bootstrapping effects are also unaccounted in simple exponential power formulations.

Candidate metric:

$CIQ_t = \mathcal{A} e^{\mathcal{B} t}$	2

Although this metric signifies an improved performance rate (e.g., we might say $CoDIAK_{t \to t+1} = e^\mathcal{B}$), it too provides insuffienct accounting of other activities.

=== Nature of a candidate metric ===
Comparing these two insufficient candidates illustrates the same key aspect underpinning Engelbart's law: human organization and directed activity are the essential elements to our performance.

An implication of the foregoing as insufficient Bootstrapping metrics is that simple exponential power relationships are insufficient to improve CoDIAK abilities. By definition this result precludes a simple combination of such metrics or laws, such as a factor or power relationship between Moore's law and Metcalfe's law (or variations thereon).

Various complex power functions, incorporating the effect of efforts at each of the ABC-level Activities were considered as candidates.

$CIQ_t = \mathcal{A} e^{\mathcal{B} t} \mathcal{C}_t$	3

$CIQ_t = \mathcal{A} e^{\mathcal{B} t \mathcal{C}_t}$	4

$CIQ_t = \mathcal{A} e^{\mathcal{B} \int\limits_{0}^{t} \mathcal{C}_x \, dx}$	5

The differences illustrate the interplay and interdependencies of A-level, B-level and C-level Activities, and the Bootstrapping effects (improved improvement). In all three, improvement to CIQ, CoDIAK, and Bootstrapping itself depends on a recursive application of B-level Activities and C-level Activities.

== Examples in practice ==
Although levels of exponential rates of performance, over many time periods and in many domains, with respect to quantity, extent, or degree, is well-documented by Lienhard and many others, modern and real-time ongoing of Bootstrapping levels of performance remain difficult to find.

== Relevance in general ==
In explicitly placing within the human sphere the locus of ability for improving our improvement, Engelbart's law chides us against choosing anemic measures of change in performance. Linear rates, or simple compound rates fall far short of our intrinsic abilities.

In addition to envisioning the Bootstrap Paradigm, describing the nature of a suitable socio-technical fabric, Engelbart envisioned its particular characteristics, which, when placed into use, and subjected to improvement upon improvement, would meet human requirements.

In this way, to fully use A-, B-, and C-level Activities, and achieve bootstrapping-levels of performance, we may more easily and readily redefine our measures until we have a suitable basis for such performance:

- Include a larger community in A, B, or C-level Activities
- Redefine the problem, include the impact over a larger, or more focused collection of stakeholders
- Include previously-externalized costs
- Include measures for knock-on effects
- Measure second-party costs or benefits from third-party inaction or actions
- Radically increase speed or extent of the incorporation or diffusion of inquiry or knowledge

Engelbart, in writing and working, intended to apply this method of working to all domains of human endeavor, from the individual to the whole species, in private or public service.

== See also ==
- Moore's law
- Metcalfe's law
- The Engines of Our Ingenuity
- Superintelligence
- Intelligence amplification
- Experience curve effect
- Swanson's law
