= Rowena Swanson =

American information scientist

Rowena Weiss Swanson (born 1928) is an American information scientist. In the 1950s and 1960s she worked for the US Patent Office and the Air Force Office of Scientific Research, helping to channel funding to computer scientists, cyberneticians and philosophers such as Douglas Engelbart, Calvin Mooers, Marvin Minsky, Calvin Mooers, Heinz von Foerster, Gotthard Günther, Ernst von Glasersfeld, Gordon Pask, Warren McCulloch, William L. Kilmer, David Rothenberg and Max Black. In the 1970s she was Professor of Library and Information Science at the University of Denver, before working for the United States Office of Personnel Management.

== Early life and education ==
Rowena Weiss was born in Brooklyn on August 3, 1928, the daughter of Marmion Livingston Weiss (1895–1959) and Lenore Hartman (1897–1959). Wallace H. Weiss (1931–2011) was a younger brother. She attended Calvin Coolidge High School, where in 1943 she reported for the school magazine, The Courier. In 1949 she gained a bachelor's degree in chemical engineering from the Catholic University of America, In 1948 she co-authored a paper with scientists at George Washington University School of Medicine‘s Department of Pharmacology, measuring absorption of the antibiotic para-aminosalicylic acid. In 1953 she gained a JD from George Washington University.

== Defense career ==
In 1954, Weiss helped to write up a 1951 Geological Survey investigation of the Phosphoria Formation undertaken on behalf of the US Atomic Energy Commission. By 1956 she was working as Acquisitions Officer for the ASTIA Reference Center at the Library of Congress.

At some point in the 1950s, she took on the surname Swanson, presumably as the result of marriage. She joined the Office of Research and Development at the US Patent Office, becoming interested in information retrieval there.

Swanson was Project Supervisor at the Air Force Office of Scientific Research (AFOSR) in the early 1960s, working with Harold Wooster. There, from 1959 onwards, she ensured the funding of Douglas C. Englebart's research into human-machine collaboration at the Stanford Research Institute, apparently surreptitiously rescuing Englebart's application from the 'rejection' pile to put it in the 'accepted for final review' pile. Swanson helped Englebert turn his 1962 SRI report, 'Human Intellect: A Conceptual Framework', into a book chapter in 1963. She also gave editorial assistance to the ASOFR-funded work of Calvin Mooers. Throughout the 1960s Swanson continued to organize funding for computer scientists and cybernetic researchers. She helped fund Marvin Minsky, and was a friend and sponsor for Heinz von Foerster at the Biological Computer Laboratory. She also organized funding for the work of Gotthard Günther and Ernst von Glasersfeld. Ernst von Glasersfeld recalled her sponsoring his own research alongside that of Gordon Pask, Warren McCulloch, Max Black and David Rothenberg, and introducing these disparate researchers to each other.

In 1966, she was acting director of the Directorate of Information Sciences at the AFOSR, as Harold Wooster took up the post of Director previously held by Thomas K. Burgess. By 1967 she was a Project Scientist under Wooster, along with Eliot Sohmer. Another colleague was Lea M. Bohnert.

Addressing a 1970 workshop for military librarians, Frank Kurt Cylke paid tribute to the work of Wooster and Swanson at AFOSR: "Of course, Harold Wooster and Rowena Swanson are no longer concentrating their efforts upon the theoretical and practical problems that are present. Margrett Zenich, however, is still fighting the good fight." Gordon Pask, writing in 1973, acknowledged the patronage of the AFOSR's European office and emphasised the particular importance of Swanson's influence there:

In common with others in this field, we owe a special debt to Prof. Rowena Swanson who insisted throughout the formative years from 1961 to 1967, when she served in that organisation [AFOSR], upon the proper communication and integration of ongoing research.

== Academic librarianship ==
By 1968, Swanson had become Professor of Library and Information Science at the University of Denver's Graduate School of Librarianship.

Swanson served as Technical Program Chairman for the American Society for Information Science (ASIS), and was a regular contributor to the Journal of the Association for Information Science and Technology (JASIST). In 1975 her paper 'Performing Evaluation Studies in Information Science' won the Best JASIST Paper Award.

In 1979, she retired from the University of Denver to become a "consulting resources specialist for information systems design at the U.S. Office of Personnel Management".

== Works ==
- (with E. Leong Way, Paul K. Smith, Donald L. Howie and Rollan Swanson) "The absorption, distribution, excretion and fate of para-aminosalicylic acid". Journal of Pharmacology and Experimental Therapeutics. 93 (3): 368–382. July 1948. doi:10.1016/S0022-3565(25)03428-7. PMID 18882143.
- (with Simon M. Newman and Kenneth C. Knowlton) A Notation System for Transliterating Technical and Scientific Texts for Use in Data Processing Systems (Technical report). US Patent Office. 1959. R&D Report No. 15.
- (with Harold Pfeffer) Parameters for an information retrieval system for chemical processes. Patent Office. 1961.
- The AFOSR Program in Information Systems Research (Technical report). 1962.
- Information Sciences 1965. Annual report no. 3, 1965 (PDF) (Technical report). Air Force Office of Scientific Research. January 1966. AFOSR 66-0130 (AD-630 521). [Also listed as AFOSR 66-0878.]
- Cybernetics in Europe and the USSR – Activities, Plans and Impressions (Technical report). Air Force Office of Scientific Research. 1966. AFOSR 66-0579.
- Information System Networks... Let's Profit from What we Know (PDF) (Technical report). Air Force Office of Scientific Research. June 1966. AFOSR 66-0873. Reprinted in Schecter, George, ed. (1967). Information Retrieval. Washington D.C.: Thompson Book Company.
- (with Harold Wooster) Information Sciences (PDF) (Technical report).
- "Information Sciences: Some research directions". Air University Review. 17 (3): 56–66. March–April 1966.
- Influences from Cybernetics on Information Sciences (PDF) (Technical report).
- Move The Information... A Kind of Missionary Spirit (PDF) (Technical report). Air Force Office of Scientific Research. June 1967. ASOFR 67-1247.
- Information, An Exploitable Commodity (PDF) (Technical report). Air Force Office of Scientific Research. April 1968. ASOFR 68-0652.
- "User-oriented information systems". American Documentation. 20 (3): 279–280. July 1969. doi:10.1002/asi.4630200315.
- Watersheds and Information Flow (PDF) (Technical report). Air Force Office of Scientific Research. January 1969. AFOSR 69-0082TR.
- Information Entrepreneurship and Education... Prescriptions for Technological Change (PDF) (Technical report). Air Force Office of Scientific Research. March 1969. AFOSR 69-0458TR.
- A look at technologies vis-à-vis information handling techniques (Technical report). Air Force Office of Scientific Research. AFOSR 69-1205TR.
- Trends in Information Handling in the United States (PDF) (Technical report). Air Force Office of Scientific Research. May 1970. AFOSR 70-2145TR. Prepared for presentation at the 1970 Conference of the Institute of Information Scientists held at the University of Reading, Reading, England, 10–12 April 1970.
- "The information business is a people business". Information Storage and Retrieval. 6 (4): 351–361. October 1970. doi:10.1016/0020-0271(70)90028-8.
- "Moshava, Kibbutz, and Moshav: Patterns of Jewish Rural Settlement and Development in Palestine by D. Weintraub, M. Lissak and Y. Azmon". Technology and Culture. 11 (4): 645–648. October 1970. doi:10.1353/tech.1970.a894067.
- "Comment". Journal of Documentation. 28: 163. June 1972.
- "Review: Computer systems in the library: A handbook for managers and designers: Stanely J. Swihart and Beryl F. Hefley. Melville, Los Angeles, California (1973)". Information Storage and Retrieval. 10 (11–12): 423–424. doi:10.1016/0020-0271(74)90055-2.
- "Review: The bowker annual of library and book trade information: Jeanne J. Henderson, Managing Editor; Frank L. Schick, Consulting Editor. 18th Edition, 1973. R.R. Bowker company, New York, 1973. 548 pp. $19.50". Information Storage and Retrieval. 1973.
- System Analysis + Work Study = Library Accountability (PDF) (Technical report). Denver, Colorado: Southeast Metropolitan Board of Cooperative Services. 1974. SEMBCS-OR-1.
- (with Anthony Debons) "Design and Evaluation of Information Systems". Annual Review of Information Science and Technology. 9. 1974.
- "Performing evaluation studies in information science". Journal of the Association for Information Science and Technology. May 1975.
- "Cost Analysis and Budgeting". 19th Military Librarians Workshop (PDF). 1975. pp. 9–10.
- (with Claude J. Johns Jr.) Some Highlight Findings of the ASIS Membership Survey. SIC/ED Newsletter (Technical report). January 1976. pp. 8–10. ED-76-1.
- "A Work Study of the Review Production Process". Journal of the Association for Information Science and Technology. January 1976.
- "Review: Proceedings of the 1975 Clinic on Library Applications of Data Processing: The Use of Computers in Literature Searching and Related Reference Activities in Libraries. F. Wilfrid Lancaster, Ed". Journal of the Association for Information Science and Technology. 28 (2): 125–126. 1977.
- "Education for Information Science as a Profession". Journal of the Association for Information Science and Technology. 29 (3): 148–155. May 1978. doi:10.1002/asi.4630290308.
- (with James A. Engler) "Probing Private Files: Polaroid Corporation's Photo Index". Database. 3: 57–67.
- "Probing Private Files". Database. 3: 70–76. 1980.
- Study of Online Instruction Methodologies for the DTIC Training Program (PDF) (Technical report). Defense Technical Information Center. February 1981. AD-A101 460.
