= Well travelled road effect =

Cognitive bias

The well travelled road effect is a cognitive bias, coined by Jeffrey Popova-Clark in 2010, in which travellers will estimate the time taken to traverse routes differently depending on their familiarity with the route. Frequently travelled routes are assessed as taking a shorter time than unfamiliar routes. This effect creates errors when estimating the most efficient route to an unfamiliar destination, when one candidate route includes a familiar route, whilst the other candidate route includes no familiar routes. The effect is most salient when subjects are driving, but is still detectable for pedestrians and users of public transport. The effect has been observed for centuries but was first studied scientifically in the 1980s and 1990s following from earlier "heuristics and biases" work undertaken by Daniel Kahneman and Amos Tversky.

Much like the Stroop task, it is hypothesised that drivers use less cognitive effort when traversing familiar routes and therefore underestimate the time taken to traverse the familiar route. The well travelled road effect has been hypothesised as a reason that self-reported experience curve effects are overestimated.The Well Travelled road Effect, since its introduction in Wikipedia, has become widely recognised cognitive bias and has been published on widely distributed cognitive bias register such as the Bias Codex.

== See also ==
- Accuracy and precision
- Availability heuristic
- List of cognitive biases
- Weber–Fechner law
