= Quantum computing scaling laws =

Forecasting rules for quantum computing

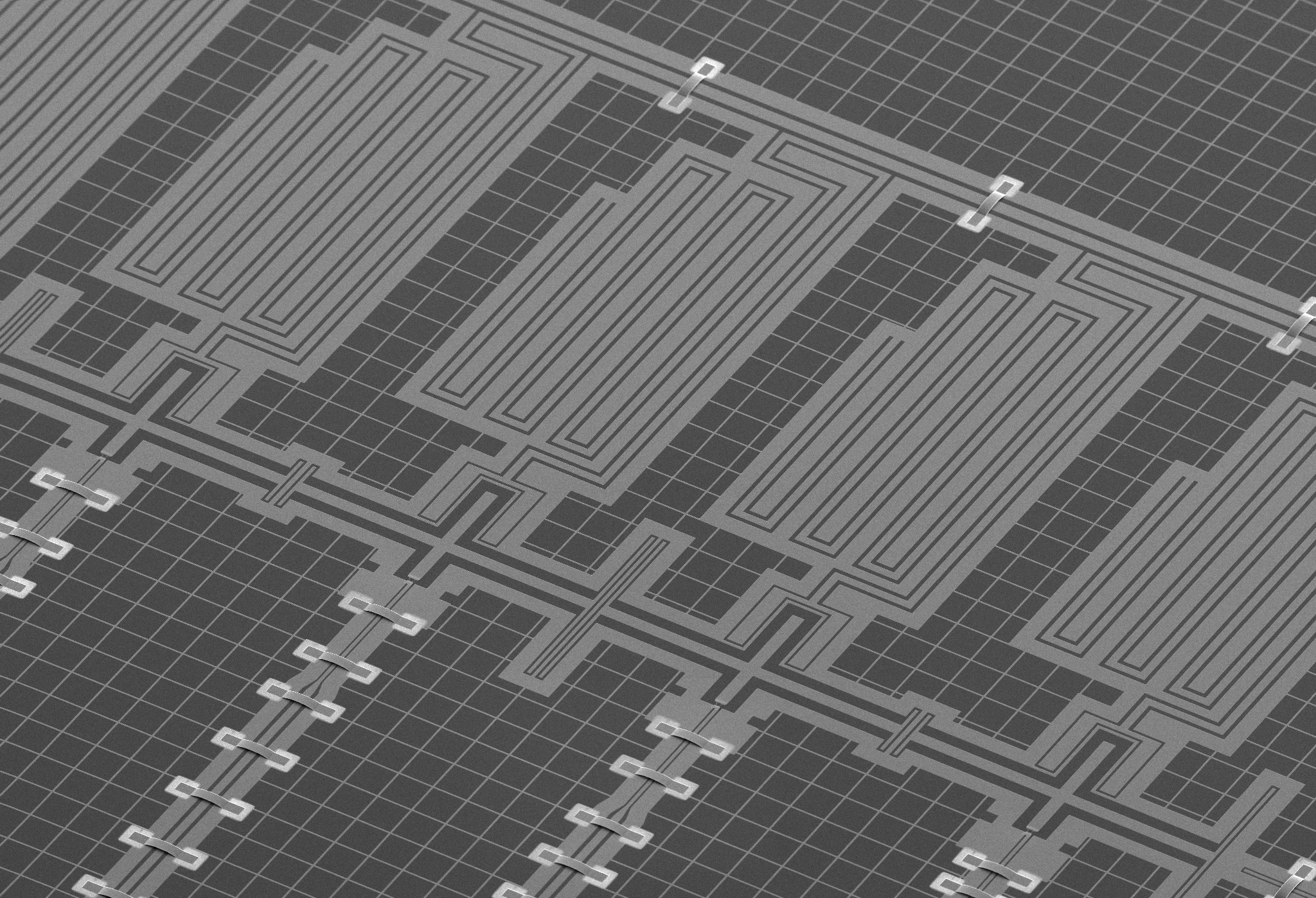
Quantum simulator based on 11 superconducting qubits.

Quantum computing scaling laws (sometimes abbreviated as QC scaling laws) are a set of observations describing the exponential growth of various aspects of quantum computer development. The most important scaling laws in quantum computing are Rose's law, Neven's law, and Schoelkopf's law. These laws are named after prominent quantum computing researchers and predict continued improvement in quantum computer performance in the coming years. However, these laws are more empirical rules of thumb and predictions based on observations rather than immutable truths, and technological development may bring unexpected challenges and breakthroughs. (Note: The introduction summarizes key points from the article’s main body, which is properly sourced. While it does not include inline citations, it is based on reliably referenced content. Removing it for lacking citations is not justified, as it provides necessary context and helps readers understand the topic.)

== Rose's law ==
Rose's law observes that the number of qubits on chips doubles roughly every 18 months. The law is often described as the quantum-computing equivalent of Moore's law. The term was coined by Steve Jurvetson after meeting D-Wave founder Geordie Rose. This law attempts to measure rapid processor scaling, though different quantum computing technologies may follow different trajectories depending on their design constraints.

== Neven's law ==
Neven's law states that the computational power of quantum computers appears to be growing at a doubly exponential rate. In other words, not only is computational power increasing exponentially—that exponential growth is itself accelerating exponentially.

The law is named for Hartmut Neven, Google's Quantum AI team lead, named one of Fast Company's Most Creative People of 2020. He has remarked: "It's not one company versus another, but rather, humankind versus nature—or humankind with nature." Neven's law suggests that quantum advantage may emerge much sooner than linear or simple exponential models predict, thanks to compounding improvements.

Some authors have noted that the conceptual basis of Neven's law—compounding exponential trends due to qubit growth and Hilbert space scaling—was discussed earlier. For example, Jonathan Dowling illustrated in Schrödinger's Killer App (2013) that qubit counts could grow exponentially and that the size of Hilbert space grows exponentially with the number of qubits, calling this “super-exponential” growth. A 2020 memorial article in Nature Photonics referred to this combined idea as the “Dowling–Neven law”, although this term is not widely used in the literature.

== Schoelkopf's law ==
Schoelkopf's law observes that decoherence times in quantum computing roughly improve tenfold every three years. Decoherence time indicates how long a quantum state remains stable enough for computation. After that, interference from the environment causes the state to decay, losing quantum information. Extending coherence is critical for running complex quantum algorithms reliably. Named after Robert J. Schoelkopf, this scaling law addresses one of quantum computing's most fundamental challenges.

== See also ==
- Quantum volume
- Superconducting quantum computing
