= Dynamic knowledge repository =

The dynamic knowledge repository (DKR) is a concept developed by Douglas C. Engelbart as a primary strategic focus for allowing humans to address complex problems. He has proposed that a DKR will enable us to develop a collective IQ greater than any individual's IQ. References and discussion of Engelbart's DKR concept are available at the Doug Engelbart Institute.

== Definition ==
A knowledge repository is a computerized system that systematically captures, organizes and categorizes an organization's knowledge. The repository can be searched and data can be quickly retrieved.

The effective knowledge repositories include factual, conceptual, procedural and meta-cognitive techniques. The key features of knowledge repositories include communication forums.

A knowledge repository can take many forms to "contain" the knowledge it holds. A customer database is a knowledge repository of customer information and insights – or electronic explicit knowledge. A Library is a knowledge repository of books – physical explicit knowledge. A community of experts is a knowledge repository of tacit knowledge or experience. The nature of the repository only changes to contain/manage the type of knowledge it holds. A repository (as opposed to an archive) is designed to get knowledge out. It should therefore have some rules of structure, classification, taxonomy, record management, etc., to facilitate user engagement.
