= Koomey's law =

Electronic hardware trend

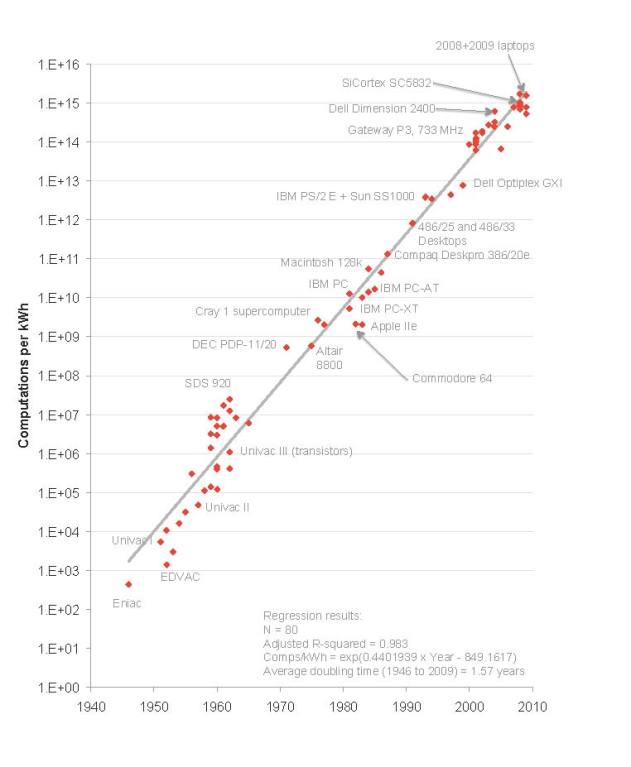
Computations per kWh, from 1946 to 2009

Koomey's law describes a trend in the history of computing hardware: for about a half-century, the number of computations per joule of energy dissipated doubled about every 1.57 years. Professor Jonathan Koomey described the trend in a 2010 paper in which he wrote that "at a fixed computing load, the amount of battery you need will fall by a factor of two every year and a half".

This trend had been remarkably stable since the 1950s (R^{2} of over 98%). But in 2016, Koomey and Naffziger re-examined this data and found that after 2000, the doubling slowed to about once every 2.6 years. This is related to the slowing of Moore's law, the ability to build smaller transistors, and the end around 2005 of Dennard scaling – the ability to build smaller transistors with constant power density.

"The difference between these two growth rates is substantial. A doubling every year and a half results in a 100-fold increase in efficiency every decade. A doubling every two and a half years yields just a 16-fold increase", Koomey wrote.

== Implications ==
The implications of Koomey's law are that the amount of battery needed for a fixed computing load will fall by a factor of 100 every decade. As computing devices become smaller and more mobile, this trend may be even more important than improvements in raw processing power for many applications. Furthermore, energy costs are becoming an increasing factor in the economics of data centers, further increasing the importance of Koomey's law.

The slowing of Koomey's law has implications for energy use in information and communications technology. However, because computers do not run at peak output continuously, the effect of this slowing may not be seen for a decade or more. Koomey writes that "as with any exponential trend, this one will eventually end ... in a decade or so, energy use will once again be dominated by the power consumed when a computer is active. And that active power will still be hostage to the physics behind the slowdown in Moore's law."

== History ==
In 2010, Koomey was the lead author of the article in IEEE Annals of the History of Computing that first documented the trend. At about the same time, Koomey published a short piece about it in IEEE Spectrum.

It was further discussed in MIT Technology Review, and in a post by Erik Brynjolfsson on the "Economics of Information" blog, and at The Economist online.

The trend was previously known for digital signal processors, and it was then named "Gene's law". The name came from Gene Frantz, an electrical engineer at Texas Instruments. Frantz had documented that power dissipation in DSPs had been reduced by half every 18 months, over a 25-year period.

== Slowing and end of Koomey's law ==
Latest studies indicate that Koomey's Law has slowed to doubling every 2.6 years. This rate is a statistical average over many technologies and many years, but there are exceptions. For example, in 2020 AMD reported that, since 2014, the company has managed to improve the efficiency of its mobile processors by a factor of 31.7, which is a doubling rate of 1.2 years. In June 2020, Koomey responded to the report, writing: "I have reviewed the data and can report that AMD exceeded the 25×20 goal it set in 2014 through improved design, superior optimization, and a laser-like focus on energy efficiency."

By the second law of thermodynamics and Landauer's principle, logically irreversible computing, which erases information, cannot continue to be made more energy efficient forever. Extrapolating a doubling every 2.6 years from the most efficient supercomputer as of 2022 would reach the Landauer bound only after several more decades; the exact date depends on how many bits are assumed to be erased per operation. Thus, after this point, Koomey's law can no longer hold. Landauer's principle, however, does not constrain the efficiency of reversible computing. This, in conjunction with other Beyond CMOS computing technologies, could permit continued advances in efficiency.

== See also ==
- Dennard scaling
- Limits of computation
- Performance per watt
- Swanson's law
