= Jonathan Koomey =

Jonathan Koomey is a researcher who identified a long-term trend in energy-efficiency of computing that has come to be known as Koomey's law. From 1984 to 2003, Dr. Koomey was at Lawrence Berkeley National Laboratory, where he founded and led the End-Use Forecasting group, and has been a visiting professor at Stanford University, Yale University, and the University of California, Berkeley. He has also been a lecturer and a consulting professor at Stanford and a lecturer at UC Berkeley. He is a 1984 graduate of Harvard University (A.B) and University of California at Berkeley (M.S. and Ph.D). His research focuses on the economics of greenhouse gas emissions and the effects of information technology on resource use. He has also published extensively on critical thinking skills and business analytics.

== See also ==
- Winning the Oil Endgame

== Works ==
- Koomey, Jonathan. 2017. Turning Numbers into Knowledge: Mastering the Art of Problem Solving. 3rd ed. El Dorado Hills, CA: Analytics Press.
- Koomey, Jonathan. 2008. Worldwide electricity used in data centers. Environmental Research Letters. vol. 3, no. 034008. September 23.
- Koomey, Jonathan G., Stephen Berard, Marla Sanchez, and Henry Wong. 2011. Implications of Historical Trends in the Electrical Efficiency of Computing. IEEE Annals of the History of Computing. vol. 33, no. 3. July–September. pp. 46–54.
- Koomey, Jonathan G. 2012. Cold Cash, Cool Climate: Science-Based Advice for Ecological Entrepreneurs. El Dorado Hills, CA: Analytics Press.
- Koomey, Jonathan, Zachary Schmidt, Holmes Hummel, and John Weyant. 2019. "Inside the Black Box: Understanding Key Drivers of Global Emission Scenarios." Environmental Modeling and Software. vol. 111, no. 1. January. pp. 268-281.
