= Haitz's law =

Observation of LED production efficiency

Illustration of Haitz's law. Light output per LED package as a function of time. Note the logarithmic scale on the vertical axis.

Haitz's law is an observation and forecast about the steady improvement, over many years, of light-emitting diodes (LEDs).

It claims that every decade, the cost per lumen (unit of useful light emitted) falls by a factor of 10, and the amount of light generated per LED package increases by a factor of 20, for a given wavelength (color) of light. It is considered the LED counterpart to Moore's law, which states that the number of transistors in a given integrated circuit doubles every 18 to 24 months. Both laws rely on the process optimization of the production of semiconductor devices.

== History ==
Haitz's law is named after Roland Haitz (1935–2015), a scientist at Agilent Technologies among others. It was first presented to the larger public at Strategies in Light 2000, the first of a series of annual conferences organized by Strategies Unlimited. Besides the forecast of exponential development of cost per lumen and amount of light per package, the publication also forecast that the luminous efficacy of LED-based lighting could reach 200 lm/W (lumen per watt) in 2020, crossing 100 lm/W in 2010. This would be the case if enough industrial and government resources were spent for research on LED-lighting. More than 50% of the electricity consumption for lighting (20% of the totally consumed electrical energy) would be saved reaching 200 lm/W. This prospect and other stepping-stone applications of LEDs (e.g. mobile phone flash and LCD-backlighting) led to a massive investment in LED-research so that the LED efficacy did indeed cross 100 lm/W in 2010. If this trend continues, LEDs will become the most efficient light source by 2020.

The theoretical maximum for truncated blackbody white light source (at 5800K colour temperature with wavelengths restricted to the visible band of between 400nm and 700nm) is 251 lm/W. However, some "white" LEDs have achieved efficacies of over 300 lm/W.

== Developments ==
In 2010, Cree Inc., developed and marketed the XM-L LED that claimed 1000 lumens at 100 lm/W efficacy and 160 lm/W at 350 mA and 150 lm/W at 700 mA. They also claimed to have broken the 200 lm/W barrier in R&D with a prototype producing 208 lm at 350 mA. In May 2011, Cree announced another prototype with 231 lm/W efficacy at 350 mA. In March 2014, Cree announced another prototype with a record-breaking 303 lm/W efficacy at 350 mA.

In 2017, Philips Lighting started offering consumer LED lights with 200 lm/W efficacy in Dubai using LED filament technology, three years before what Haitz's law predicted.
