= Carlson curve =

Describes the rate of DNA sequencing or cost per sequenced base as a function of time

Total cost of sequencing a human genome over time as calculated by the NHGRI.

The Carlson curve is a term to describe the rate of DNA sequencing or cost per sequenced base as a function of time. It is the biotechnological equivalent of Moore's law. Carlson predicted that the doubling time of DNA sequencing technologies (measured by cost and performance) would be at least as fast as Moore's law.

== History ==
The term was coined by The Economist and is named after author Rob Carlson.

Carlson curves illustrate the rapid (in some cases above exponential growth) decreases in cost, and increases in performance, of a variety of technologies, including DNA sequencing, DNA synthesis and a range of physical and computational tools used in protein production and in determining protein structures.

== Next generation sequencing ==
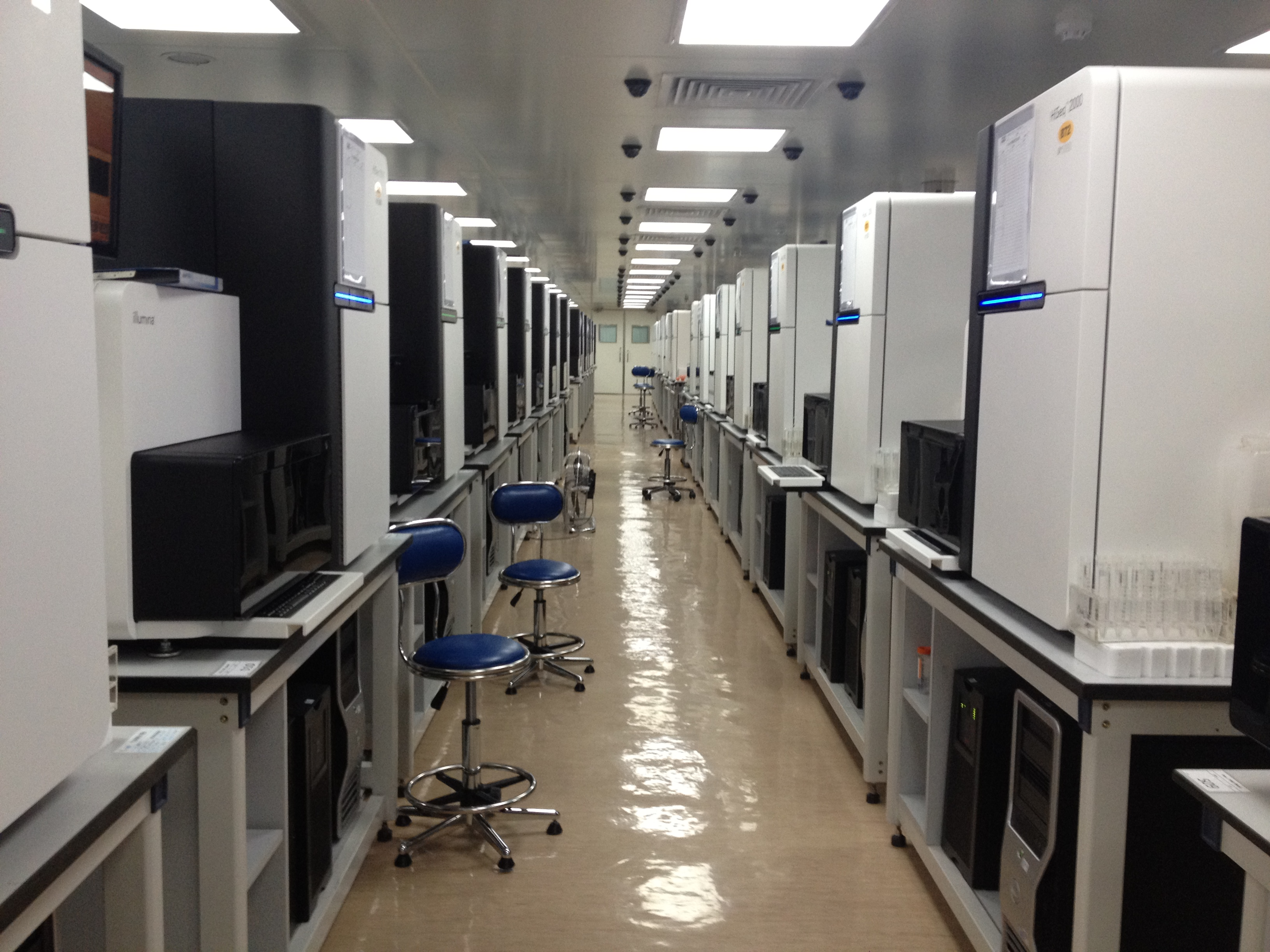
Sequencing floor in BGI Hong Kong, showing the Illumina Hiseq 2000 sequencers

Moore's Law started being profoundly out-paced in January 2008 when the centers transitioned from Sanger sequencing to newer DNA sequencing technologies: 454 sequencing with average read length=300-400 bases (10-fold) Illumina and SOLiD sequencing with average read length=50-100 bases (30-fold).
