= Eroom's law =

Observation about the discovery of new drugs

Eroom's law is the observation that drug discovery is becoming slower and more expensive over time, despite improvements in technology (such as high-throughput screening, biotechnology, combinatorial chemistry, and computational drug design), a trend first observed in the 1980s. The inflation-adjusted cost of developing a new drug roughly doubles every nine years. In order to highlight the contrast with the exponential advancements of other forms of technology (such as transistors) over time, the name given to the observation is Moore's law spelled backwards. The term was coined by Jack Scannell and colleagues in 2012 in Nature Reviews Drug Discovery.

== Causes ==
The article that proposed the law attributes it to four main causes:

- The 'better than the Beatles' problem: The sense that new drugs only have modest incremental benefit over drugs already widely considered as successful, such as Lipitor, and treatment effects on top of already effective treatments are smaller than treatment effects versus placebo. The smaller size of these treatment effects mandates an increase in clinical trial sizes to show the same level of efficacy. This problem was phrased as "better than the Beatles" to highlight the fact that it would be difficult to come up with new successful pop songs if all new songs had to be better than the Beatles.
- The 'cautious regulator' problem: The progressive lowering of risk tolerance seen by drug regulatory agencies that makes research and development (R&D) both costlier and harder. After older drugs (such as Thalidomide or Vioxx) are removed from the market due to safety reasons, the bar on safety for new drugs is increased.
- The 'throw money at it' tendency: The tendency to add human resources and other resources to R&D, which may lead to project overrun.
- The 'basic research–brute force' bias: The tendency to overestimate the ability of advances in basic research and brute force screening methods to show a molecule as safe and effective in clinical trials. From the 1960s to the 1990s (and later), drug discovery has shifted from whole-animal classical pharmacology testing methods (phenotypic screening) to reverse pharmacology target-approaches that result in the discovery of drugs that may tightly bind with high-affinity to target proteins, but which still often fail in clinical trials due to an under-appreciation of the complexity of the whole organism. Furthermore, drug discovery techniques have shifted from small-molecule and iterative low-throughput search strategies to target-based high-throughput screening (HTS) of large compound libraries. But despite being faster and cheaper, HTS approaches may be less productive.

While some suspect a lack of "low-hanging fruit" as a significant contribution to Eroom's law, this may be less important than the four main causes, as there are still many decades' worth of new potential drug targets relative to the number of targets which already have been exploited, even if the industry exploits 4 to 5 new targets per year. There is also space to explore selectively non-selective drugs (or "dirty drugs") that interact with several molecular targets, and which may be particularly effective as central nervous system (CNS) therapeutics, even though few of them have been introduced in the last few decades.

As of 2018, academic spinouts and small biotech startups have surpassed Big Pharma with respect to the number of best-selling drugs approved, with 24/30 (80%) originating outside of Big Pharma.

== Critiques ==
An alternative hypothesis is that the pharmaceutical industry has become cartelized and formed a bureaucratic oligopoly, resulting in reduced innovation and efficiency. As of 2022, approximately 20 Big Pharma companies control the majority of global branded drug sales (on the scale of ±$1 trillion annually). Critics point out that Big Pharma has reduced investment in R&D, spending double on marketing, and have focused on elevating drug prices instead of risk-taking.
