= Swanson's law =

Photovoltaic pricing observation

Swanson's law–stating that solar module prices have dropped about 20% for each doubling of installed capacity—defines the "learning rate" of solar photovoltaics.

Swanson's law is the observation that the price of solar photovoltaic modules tends to drop 20 percent for every doubling of cumulative shipped volume. At present rates, costs go down 75% about every ten years.

== Origin ==
It is named after Richard Swanson, the founder of SunPower Corporation, a solar panel manufacturer. The term Swanson's Law appears to have originated with an article in The Economist published in late 2012. Swanson had been presenting such curves at technical conferences for several years.

Swanson's law has been compared to Moore's law, which predicts the growing computing power of processors. Swanson's Law is a solar industry specific application of the more general Wright's Law which states there will be a fixed cost reduction for each doubling of manufacturing volume.

== Technical background ==
The method used by Swanson is more commonly referred to as learning curve or more precisely experience curve analysis. It was first developed and applied to the aeronautics industry in 1936 by Theodore Paul Wright. There are reports of it first being applied to the photovoltaics industry in 1975, and saw wider use starting in the early 1990s.

Crystalline silicon photovoltaic cell prices have fallen from $76.67 per watt in 1977 to $0.36 per watt in 2014. Plotting the module price (in $/Wp) versus time shows a dropping by 10% per year.

== See also ==
- Economies of scale
- Growth of photovoltaics
- Learning curve
- Log–log plot
- Moore's law
- Photovoltaic system
- Wright's Law
- Engelbart's law
