= LWI =

LWI may refer to:

- Legal Writing Institute, an American non-profit organization
- Lasing without inversion, a laser technique
- Living Water International, a faith-based non-profit organization that helps communities in developing countries to create sustainable water, sanitation and hygiene practices
