= Laser =

Device that emits light via optical amplification

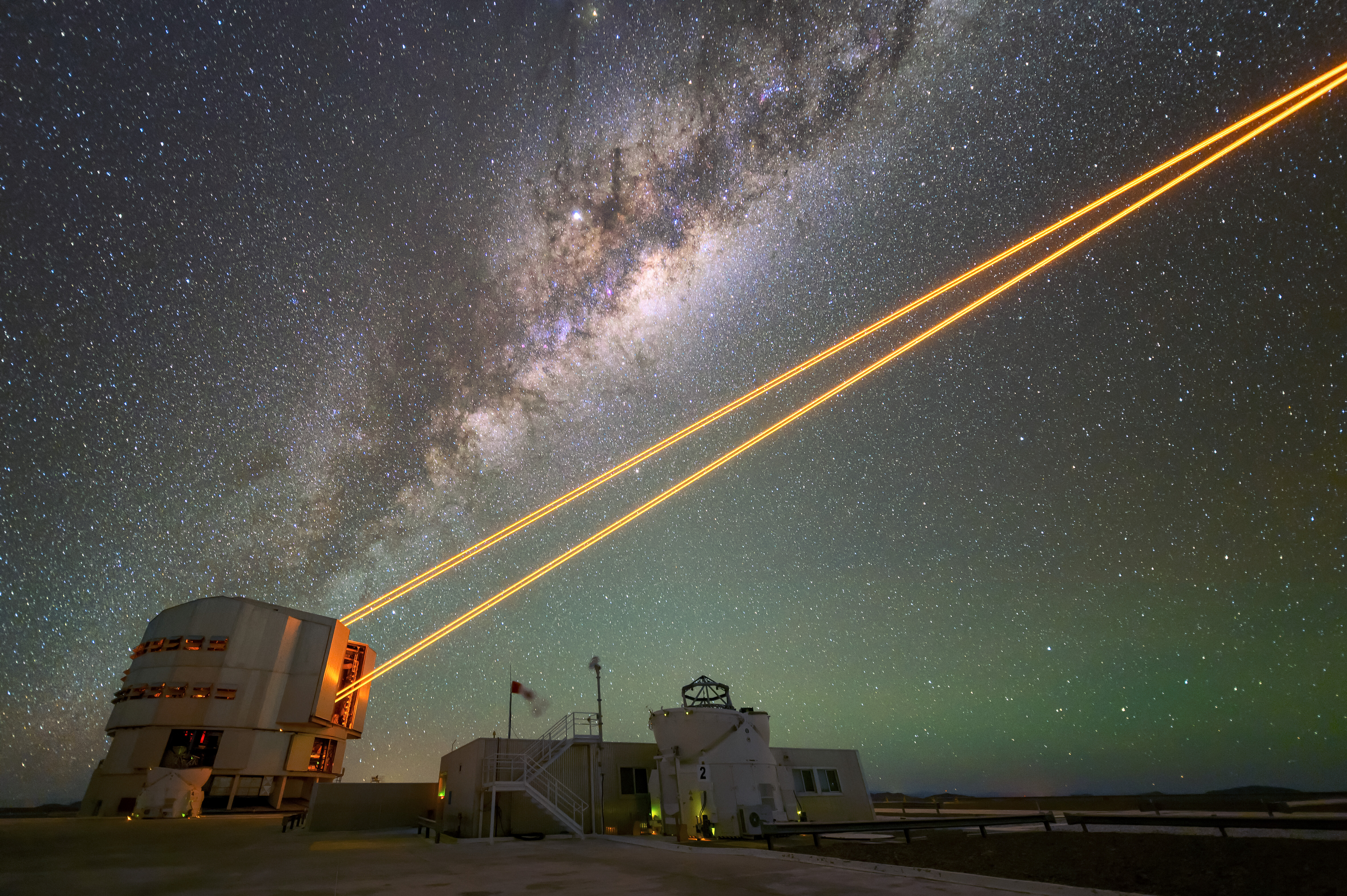
A telescope in the Very Large Telescope system producing four orange laser guide stars

A laser is a device that emits light through a process of optical amplification based on the stimulated emission of electromagnetic radiation. The word laser originated as an acronym for light amplification by stimulated emission of radiation. The first laser was built in 1960 by Theodore Maiman at Hughes Research Laboratories, based on theoretical work by Charles H. Townes and Arthur Leonard Schawlow and the optical amplifier patented by Gordon Gould.

A laser differs from other sources of light in that it emits light that is coherent. Spatial coherence allows a laser to be focused to a tight spot, enabling uses such as optical communication, laser cutting, and lithography. It also allows a laser beam to stay narrow over great distances (collimation), used in laser pointers, lidar, and free-space optical communication. Lasers can also have high temporal coherence, which permits them to emit light with a very narrow frequency spectrum. Temporal coherence can also be used to produce ultrashort pulses of light with a broad spectrum but durations measured in attoseconds.

Lasers are used in fiber-optic and free-space optical communications, optical disc drives, laser printers, barcode scanners, semiconductor chip manufacturing (photolithography, etching), laser surgery and skin treatments, cutting and welding materials, military and law enforcement devices for marking targets and measuring range and speed, and in laser lighting displays for entertainment. The laser is regarded as one of the greatest inventions of the 20th century.

== Terminology ==
The first device using amplification by stimulated emission operated at microwave frequencies, and was called a maser, for "microwave amplification by stimulated emission of radiation". When similar optical devices were developed they were first called optical masers, until "microwave" was replaced by "light" in the acronym, to become laser.

Gordon Gould first published the acronym "LASER" in the 1959 conference paper The LASER, Light Amplification by Stimulated Emission of Radiation. Gould's intention was that different "-ASER" acronyms should be used for different parts of the spectrum: "XASER" for x-rays, "UVASER" for ultraviolet, "RASER" for radio-wave, etc. Instead, today all such devices operating at frequencies higher than microwaves (approximately above 300 GHz) are called lasers (e.g. infrared lasers, visible lasers, ultraviolet lasers, X-ray lasers, gamma-ray lasers), whereas devices operating at microwave or lower radio frequencies are called masers.

The back-formed verb "to lase" is frequently used in the field, meaning "to give off coherent light," especially about the gain medium of a laser; when a laser is operating, it is said to be "lasing". The terms laser and maser are also used for naturally occurring coherent emissions, as in astrophysical maser and atom laser.

A laser that produces light by itself is technically an optical oscillator rather than an optical amplifier as suggested by the acronym. It has been humorously noted that the acronym LOSER, for "light oscillation by stimulated emission of radiation", would have been more correct. Some sources refer to the word laser as an anacronym, meaning an acronym so widely used as a noun that it is no longer considered an abbreviation.

== Fundamentals ==
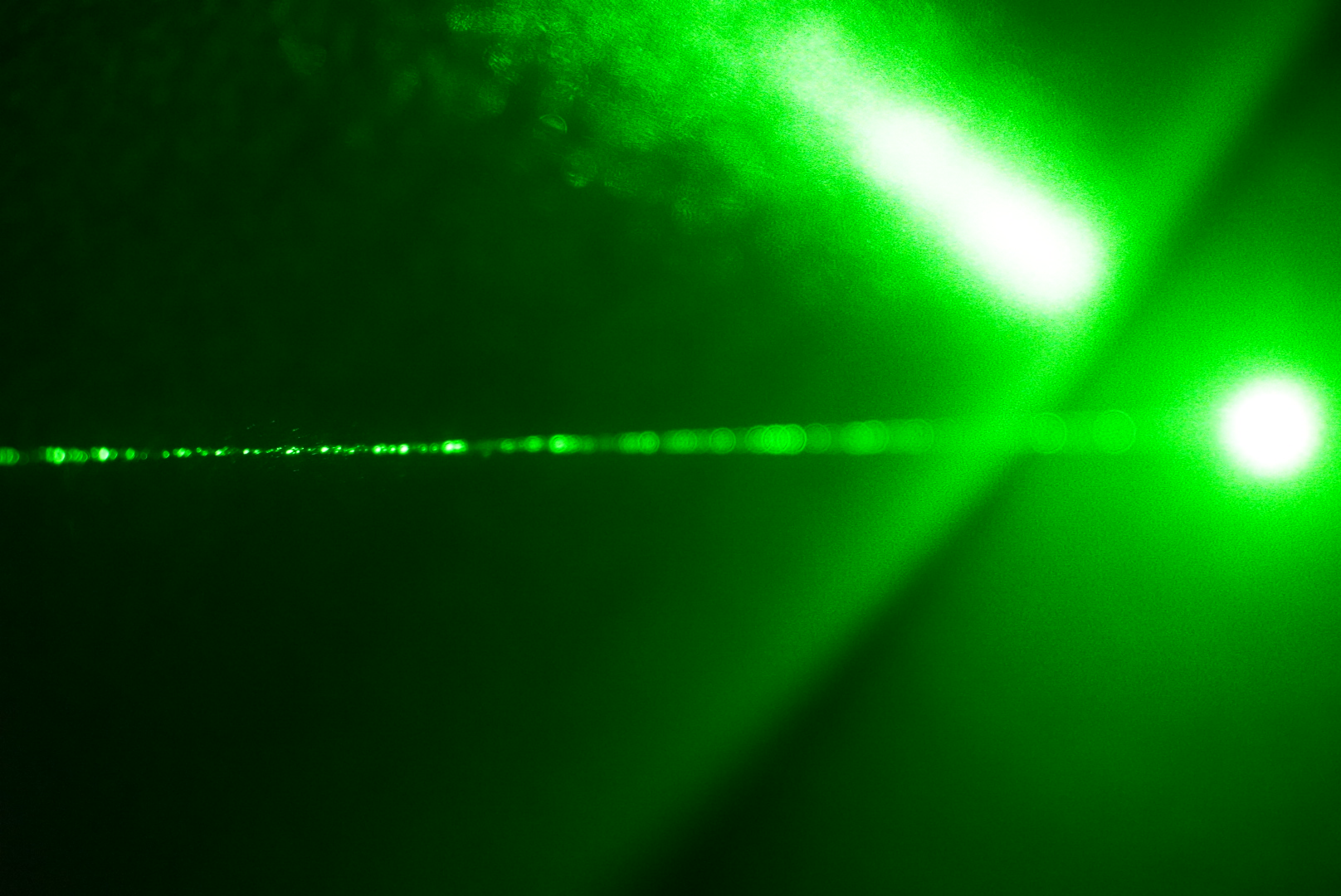
A laser can produce a very narrow beam of light of a single wavelength, in this case, green.

Photons, the quanta of electromagnetic radiation, are released and absorbed from energy levels in atoms and molecules. In a lightbulb or a star, the energy is emitted from many different levels giving photons with a broad range of energies. This process is called thermal radiation.

The underlying physical process creating photons in a laser is the same as in thermal radiation, but the actual emission is not the result of random thermal processes. Instead, the release of a photon is triggered by the nearby passage of another photon. This is called stimulated emission. For this process to work, the passing photon must be similar in energy, and thus wavelength, to the one that could be released by the atom or molecule, and the atom or molecule must be in the suitable excited state.

The photon that is emitted by stimulated emission is identical to the photon that triggered its emission, and both photons can go on to trigger stimulated emission in other atoms, creating the possibility of a chain reaction. For this to happen, many of the atoms or molecules must be in the proper excited state so that the photons can trigger them. In most materials, atoms or molecules drop out of excited states fairly rapidly, making it difficult or impossible to produce a chain reaction. The materials chosen for lasers are the ones that have metastable states, which stay excited for a relatively long time. In laser physics, such a material is called an active laser medium. Combined with an energy source that continues to "pump" energy into the material, it is possible to have enough atoms or molecules in an excited state for a chain reaction to develop.

Lasers are distinguished from other light sources by their coherence. Spatial (or transverse) coherence is typically expressed through the output being a narrow beam, which is diffraction-limited. Laser beams can be focused to very tiny spots, achieving a very high irradiance, or they can have a very low divergence to concentrate their power at a great distance. Temporal (or longitudinal) coherence implies a polarized wave at a single frequency, whose phase is correlated over a relatively great distance (the coherence length) along the beam. A beam produced by a thermal or other incoherent light source has an instantaneous amplitude and phase that vary randomly with respect to time and position, thus having a short coherence length.

Lasers are characterized according to their wavelength in a vacuum. Most "single wavelength" lasers produce radiation in several modes with slightly different wavelengths. Although temporal coherence implies some degree of monochromaticity, some lasers emit a broad spectrum of light or emit different wavelengths of light simultaneously. Certain lasers are not single spatial mode and have light beams that diverge more than is required by the diffraction limit. All such devices are classified as "lasers" based on the method of producing light by stimulated emission. Lasers are employed where light of the required spatial or temporal coherence can not be produced using simpler technologies.

== Design ==
Components of a typical laser: 1. Gain medium; 2. Laser pumping energy; 3. High reflector; 4. Output coupler; 5. Laser beam

A laser consists of a gain medium, a mechanism to energize the gain medium, and something to provide optical feedback. The gain medium is a material with properties that allow it to amplify light by way of stimulated emission. Light of a specific wavelength that passes through the gain medium is amplified (i.e., its power increases). Feedback enables stimulated emission to amplify predominantly the optical frequency at the peak of the gain-frequency curve. As stimulated emission grows, eventually one frequency dominates over all others, meaning that a coherent beam has been formed.

The process of stimulated emission is analogous to that of an audio oscillator with positive feedback which can occur, for example, when the speaker in a public-address system is placed in proximity to the microphone. The screech one hears is audio oscillation at the peak of the gain-frequency curve for the amplifier.

For the gain medium to amplify light, it needs to be supplied with energy in a process called pumping. The energy is typically supplied as an electric current or as light at a different wavelength. Pump light may be provided by a flash lamp or by another laser.

The most common type of laser uses feedback from an optical cavity—a pair of mirrors on either end of the gain medium. Light bounces back and forth between the mirrors, passing through the gain medium and being amplified each time. Typically one of the two mirrors, the output coupler, is partially transparent. Some of the light escapes through this mirror. Depending on the design of the cavity (whether the mirrors are flat or curved), the light coming out of the laser may spread out or form a narrow beam. In analogy to electronic oscillators, this device is sometimes called a laser oscillator.

Most practical lasers contain additional elements that affect the properties of the emitted light, such as the polarization, wavelength, and shape of the beam.

== Theory of operation ==
=== Stimulated emission ===
Animation explaining stimulated emission and the laser principle

An atom has discrete or quantum energy levels. An atom can absorb energy from light (photons) or heat (phonons) only if there is a transition between energy levels that match the energy carried by the photon or phonon. For light, this means that any given transition will only absorb one particular wavelength of light. Photons with the correct wavelength can cause a jump from the lower to the higher energy level. The photon is consumed in this process.

In a system in thermodynamic equilibrium, absorption events are balanced by spontaneous emission. A third process also operates: photon with the correct wavelength to be absorbed by a transition can trigger stimulated emission. The energy level of the atom drops from the higher to the lower level, emitting a photon that matches the original photon in wavelength, phase, and polarization direction. Schematically stimulated emission is:

A laser uses an energy source to excite many atoms to the higher energy state so that spontaneous emission from one atom can trigger a cascade of multiple stimulated emission events, generating a large number of photons at the same wavelength, phase and polarization.

=== Simple model ===
A simple physical model for a laser begins with Albert Einstein's 1917 quantum theory of radiation. Einstein adopted only one quantum assumption from Bohr's model of the atoms, that they exist in stationary states. Each state has an energy. Einstein treats the interaction between these atoms and a radiation field using Max Planck's classical oscillator, in effect replacing the non-specific oscillators of Planck's law with Bohr atoms. The relative phase of an oscillator and electromagnetic field determines the direction energy flows during the interaction. The probability of interaction is proportional to the spectral flux density of the electromagnetic field, $\rho(\nu, T).$ Assuming just two energy levels, $E_b>E_a$, absorption corresponds to $a \rightarrow b$ with proportionality constant, $B_{ab}$, and emission corresponds to $b \rightarrow a$ with proportionality constant, $B_{ba}$. Einstein adds a third constant, $A_{ba}$, independent of the flux density, corresponding to emission in the absence of the field. When atoms are in thermodynamic equilibrium with a radiation field, the rate of absorption has to match the sum of the two rates of emission:
$$N_b(\rho(\nu,T)B_{ba} + A_{ba}) = N_a \rho(\nu,T)B_{ab}$$
If a powerful auxiliary source excites the atoms to the higher state, then $N_a \rightarrow 0$ and the equilibrium will be broken. This is called population inversion. Some of the $N_b$ atoms will spontaneously emit light and others will respond with stimulated emission creating an avalanche of photons in phase.

=== Gain medium and cavity ===
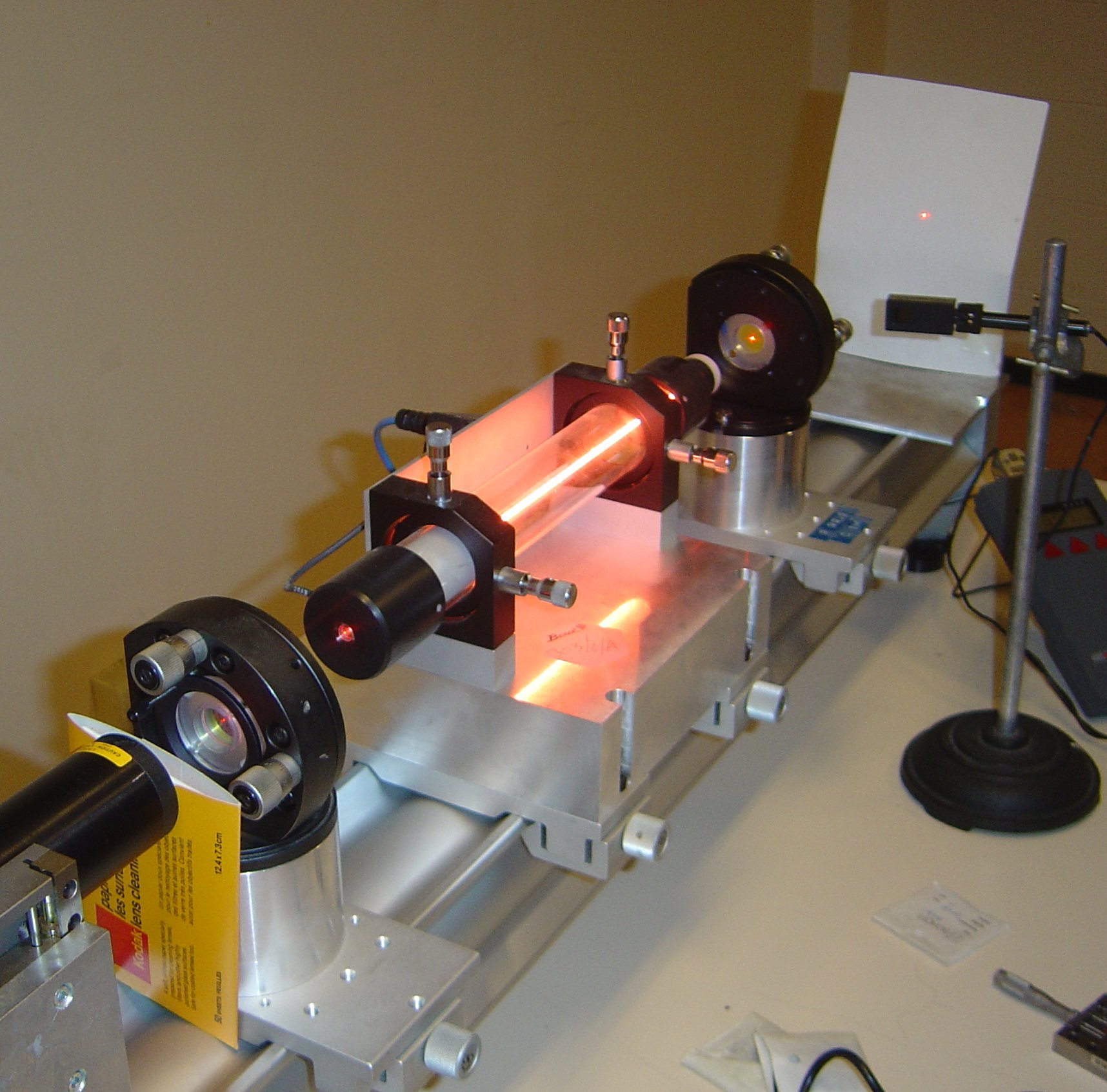
A helium–neon laser demonstration. The glow running through the center of the tube is an electric discharge. This glowing plasma is the gain medium for the laser. The laser produces a tiny, intense spot on the screen to the right. The center of the spot appears white because the image is overexposed there.

Spectrum of a helium–neon laser. The actual bandwidth is much narrower than shown; the spectrum is limited by the measuring apparatus.

The gain medium is put into an excited state by an external source of energy. In most lasers, this medium consists of a population of atoms that have been excited into such a state using an outside light source, or an electrical field that supplies energy for atoms to absorb and be transformed into their excited states.

The gain medium of a laser is normally a material of controlled purity, size, concentration, and shape, which amplifies the beam by the process of stimulated emission described above. This material can be of any state: gas, liquid, solid, or plasma. The gain medium absorbs pump energy, which raises some electrons into higher energy ("excited") quantum states. Particles can interact with light by either absorbing or emitting photons. Emission can be spontaneous or stimulated. In the latter case, the photon is emitted in the same direction as the light that is passing by. When the number of particles in one excited state exceeds the number of particles in some lower-energy state, population inversion is achieved. This situation results in light amplification from the atoms in excited states because there are more stimulated emissions than absorptions. Population inversion cannot occur in a two-level energy system: as the upper level is populated, the probability of stimulated emission increases. This prevents population inversion as the number of atoms transitioning from excited to relaxed states would be the same, deeming the process inefficient. Lasers instead use three-level or higher systems, where the additional energy level allows electrons to relax quickly and produce a consistent population inversion. A system with this property is called an optical amplifier. When an optical amplifier is placed inside a resonant optical cavity, one obtains a laser.

For lasing media with extremely high gain, so-called superluminescence, light can be sufficiently amplified in a single pass through the gain medium without requiring a resonator. Although often referred to as a laser (see, for example, nitrogen laser), the light output from such a device lacks the spatial and temporal coherence achievable with lasers. Such a device cannot be described as an oscillator but rather as a high-gain optical amplifier that amplifies its spontaneous emission. The same mechanism describes so-called astrophysical masers/lasers.

The optical resonator is sometimes referred to as an "optical cavity", but this is a misnomer: lasers use open resonators as opposed to the literal cavity that would be employed at microwave frequencies in a maser. The resonator typically consists of two mirrors between which a coherent beam of light travels in both directions, reflecting on itself so that an average photon will pass through the gain medium repeatedly before it is emitted from the output aperture or lost to diffraction or absorption. If the gain (amplification) in the medium is larger than the resonator losses, then the power of the recirculating light can rise exponentially. But each stimulated emission event returns an atom from its excited state to the ground state, reducing the gain of the medium. With increasing beam power, the net gain (gain minus loss) reduces to unity and the gain medium is said to be saturated. In a continuous wave (CW) laser, the balance of pump power against gain saturation and cavity losses produces an equilibrium value of the laser power inside the cavity; this equilibrium determines the operating point of the laser. If the applied pump power is too small, the gain will never be sufficient to overcome the cavity losses, and laser light will not be produced. The minimum pump power needed to begin laser action is called the lasing threshold. The gain medium will amplify any photons passing through it, regardless of direction; but only the photons in a spatial mode supported by the resonator will pass more than once through the medium and receive substantial amplification.

=== The light emitted ===
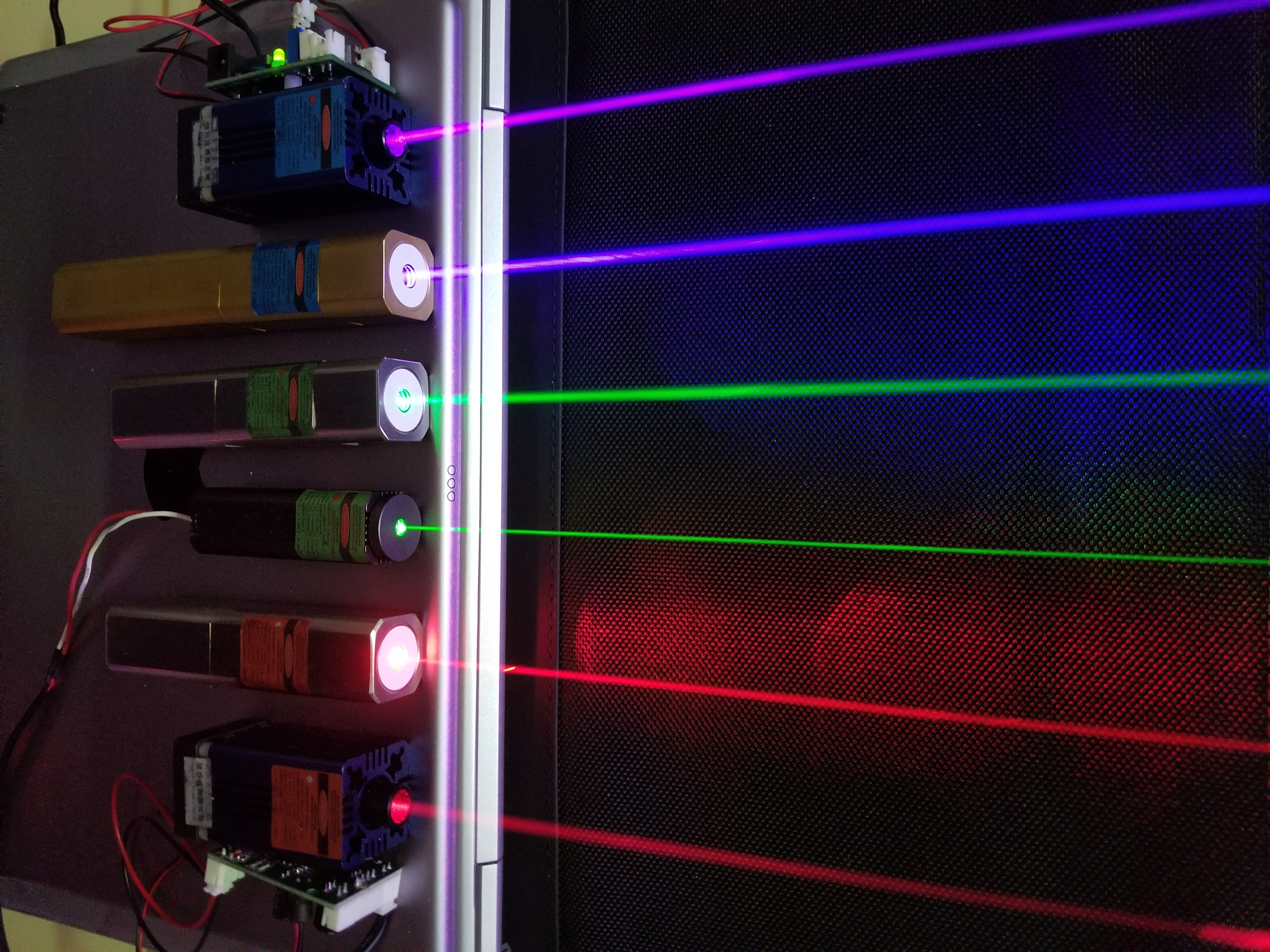
Red (660 & 635 nm), green (532 & 520 nm), and blue-violet (445 & 405 nm) lasers

In most lasers, lasing begins with spontaneous emission into the lasing mode. This initial light is then amplified by stimulated emission in the gain medium. Stimulated emission produces light that matches the input signal in direction, wavelength, and polarization, whereas the phase of the emitted light is 90 degrees in lead of the stimulating light. This, combined with the filtering effect of the optical resonator gives laser light its characteristic coherence, and may give it uniform polarization and monochromaticity, depending on the resonator's design. The fundamental laser linewidth of light emitted from the lasing resonator can be orders of magnitude narrower than the linewidth of light emitted from the passive resonator. Some lasers use a separate injection seeder to start the process off with a beam that is already highly coherent. This can produce beams with a narrower spectrum than would otherwise be possible.

In 1963, Roy J. Glauber showed that coherent states are formed from combinations of photon number states, for which he was awarded the Nobel Prize in Physics. A coherent beam of light is formed by single-frequency quantum photon states distributed according to a Poisson distribution. As a result, the arrival rate of photons in a laser beam is described by Poisson statistics.

Many lasers produce a beam that can be approximated as a Gaussian beam; such beams have the minimum divergence possible for a given beam diameter. Some lasers, particularly high-power ones, produce multimode beams, with the transverse modes often approximated using Hermite–Gaussian or Laguerre-Gaussian functions. Some high-power lasers use a flat-topped profile known as a "tophat beam". Unstable laser resonators (not used in most lasers) produce fractal-shaped beams. Specialized optical systems can produce more complex beam geometries, such as Bessel beams and optical vortexes.

Near the "waist" (or focal region) of a laser beam, it is highly collimated: the wavefronts are planar, normal to the direction of propagation, with no beam divergence at that point. However, due to diffraction, that can only remain true well within the Rayleigh range. The beam of a single transverse mode (gaussian beam) laser eventually diverges at an angle that varies inversely with the beam diameter, as required by diffraction theory. Thus, the "pencil beam" directly generated by a common helium–neon laser would spread out to a size of perhaps 500 kilometers when shone on the Moon (from the distance of the Earth). On the other hand, the light from a semiconductor laser typically exits the tiny crystal with a large divergence: up to 50°. However even such a divergent beam can be transformed into a similarly collimated beam employing a lens system, as is always included, for instance, in a laser pointer whose light originates from a laser diode. That is possible due to the light being of a single spatial mode. This unique property of laser light, spatial coherence, cannot be replicated using standard light sources (except by discarding most of the light) as can be appreciated by comparing the beam from a flashlight (torch) or spotlight to that of almost any laser.

A laser beam profiler is used to measure the intensity profile, width, and divergence of laser beams.

Diffuse reflection of a laser beam from a matte surface produces a speckle pattern with interesting properties.

=== Quantum vs. classical emission processes ===
The mechanism of producing radiation in a laser relies on stimulated emission, where energy is extracted from a transition in an atom or molecule. Stimulated emission is a quantum phenomenon that was predicted by Albert Einstein, who derived the relationship between the A coefficient, describing spontaneous emission, and the B coefficient which applies to absorption and stimulated emission. In the absence of an electric field, the spontaneous emission coefficient, A_{21}, is the probability per unit time of emission due to a transition from an excited state (level 2) to the ground state (level 1). In an electric field both emission and absorption is possible. B_{21} is the probability of the emission; B_{12} is the probability of the absorption.

== Modes of operation ==
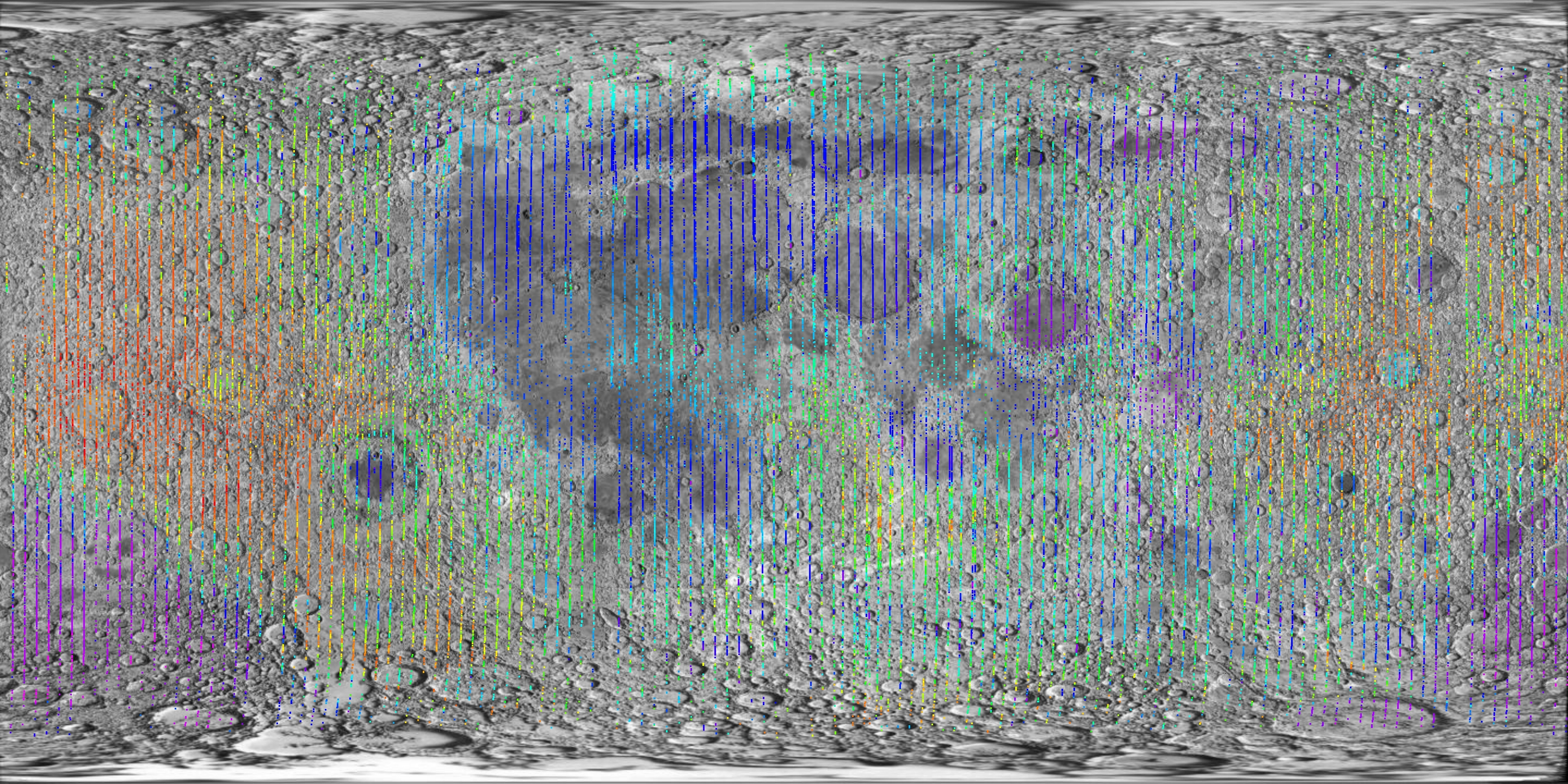
Lidar measurements of lunar topography made by Clementine mission

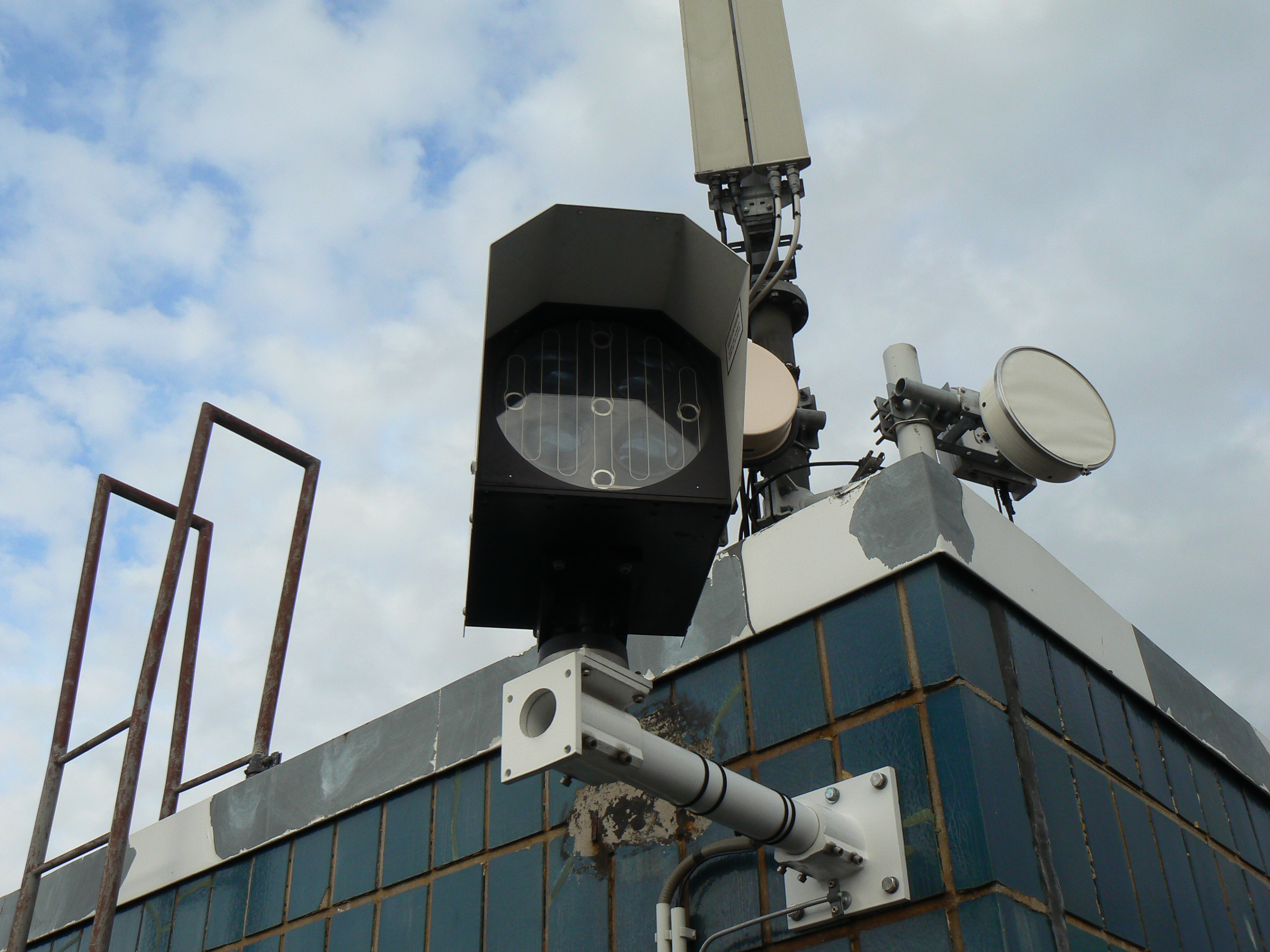
Laserlink point to point optical wireless network

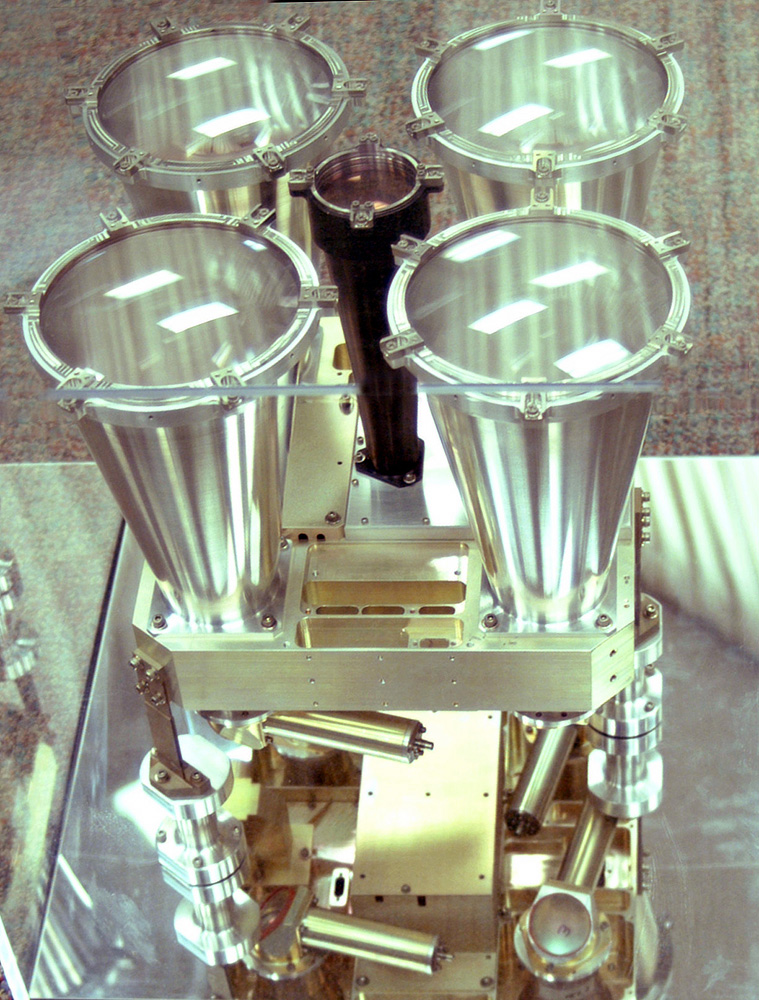
Mercury Laser Altimeter (MLA) of the MESSENGER spacecraft

A laser can be classified as operating in either continuous or pulsed mode, depending on whether the power output is essentially continuous over time or whether its output takes the form of pulses of light on one or another time scale. Of course, even a laser whose output is normally continuous can be intentionally turned on and off at some rate to create pulses of light. When the modulation rate is on time scales much slower than the cavity lifetime and the period over which energy can be stored in the lasing medium or pumping mechanism, then it is still classified as a "modulated" or "pulsed" continuous wave laser. Most laser diodes used in communication systems fall into that category.

=== Continuous-wave operation ===
Some applications of lasers depend on a beam whose output power is constant over time. Such a laser is known as a continuous-wave (CW) laser. Many types of lasers can be made to operate in continuous-wave mode to satisfy such an application. Many of these lasers lase in several longitudinal modes at the same time, and beats between the slightly different optical frequencies of those oscillations will produce amplitude variations on time scales shorter than the round-trip time (the reciprocal of the frequency spacing between modes), typically a few nanoseconds or less. In most cases, these lasers are still termed "continuous-wave" as their output power is steady when averaged over longer periods, with the very high-frequency power variations having little or no impact on the intended application. (However, the term is not applied to mode-locked lasers, where the intention is to create very short pulses at the rate of the round-trip time.)

For continuous-wave operation, the population inversion of the gain medium needs to be continually replenished by a steady pump source. In some lasing media, this is impossible. In some other lasers, it would require pumping the laser at a very high continuous power level, which would be impractical, or destroying the laser by producing excessive heat. Such lasers cannot be run in CW mode.

=== Pulsed operation ===
The pulsed operation of lasers refers to any laser not classified as a continuous wave so that the optical power appears in pulses of some duration at some repetition rate. This encompasses a wide range of technologies addressing many different motivations. Some lasers are pulsed simply because they cannot be run in continuous mode.

In other cases, the application requires the production of pulses having as large an energy as possible. Since the pulse energy is equal to the average power divided by the repetition rate, this goal can sometimes be satisfied by lowering the rate of pulses so that more energy can be built up between pulses. In laser ablation, for example, a small volume of material at the surface of a workpiece can be evaporated if it is heated in a very short time, while supplying the energy gradually would allow for the heat to be absorbed into the bulk of the piece, never attaining a sufficiently high temperature at a particular point.

Other applications rely on the peak pulse power (rather than the energy in the pulse), especially to obtain nonlinear optical effects. For a given pulse energy, this requires creating pulses of the shortest possible duration utilizing techniques such as Q-switching.

The optical bandwidth of a pulse cannot be narrower than the reciprocal of the pulse width. In the case of extremely short pulses, that implies lasing over a considerable bandwidth, quite contrary to the very narrow bandwidths typical of CW lasers. The lasing medium in some dye lasers and vibronic solid-state lasers produces optical gain over a wide bandwidth, making a laser possible that can thus generate pulses of light as short as a few femtoseconds (10^{−15} s).

==== Q-switching ====
In a Q-switched laser, the population inversion is allowed to build up by introducing loss inside the resonator which exceeds the gain of the medium; this can also be described as a reduction of the quality factor or 'Q' of the cavity. Then, after the pump energy stored in the laser medium has approached the maximum possible level, the introduced loss mechanism (often an electro- or acousto-optical element) is rapidly removed (or that occurs by itself in a passive device), allowing lasing to begin which rapidly obtains the stored energy in the gain medium. This results in a short pulse incorporating that energy, and thus a high peak power.

==== Mode locking ====
A mode-locked laser is capable of emitting extremely short pulses on the order of tens of picoseconds down to less than 10 femtoseconds. These pulses repeat at the round-trip time, that is, the time that it takes light to complete one round trip between the mirrors comprising the resonator. Due to the Fourier limit (also known as energy–time uncertainty), a pulse of such short temporal length has a spectrum spread over a considerable bandwidth. Thus such a gain medium must have a gain bandwidth sufficiently broad to amplify those frequencies. An example of a suitable material is titanium-doped, artificially grown sapphire (Ti:sapphire), which has a very wide gain bandwidth and can thus produce pulses of only a few femtoseconds duration.

Such mode-locked lasers are a most versatile tool for researching processes occurring on extremely short time scales (known as femtosecond physics, femtosecond chemistry and ultrafast science), for maximizing the effect of nonlinearity in optical materials (e.g. in second-harmonic generation, parametric down-conversion, optical parametric oscillators). Unlike the giant pulse of a Q-switched laser, consecutive pulses from a mode-locked laser are phase-coherent; that is, the pulses (and not just their envelopes) are identical and perfectly periodic. For this reason, and the extremely large peak powers attained by such short pulses, such lasers are invaluable in certain areas of research.

==== Pulsed pumping ====
Another method of achieving pulsed laser operation is to pump the laser material with a source that is itself pulsed, either through electronic charging in the case of flash lamps, or another laser that is already pulsed. Pulsed pumping was historically used with dye lasers where the inverted population lifetime of a dye molecule was so short that a high-energy, fast pump was needed. The way to overcome this problem was to charge up large capacitors which are then switched to discharge through flashlamps, producing an intense flash. Pulsed pumping is also required for three-level lasers in which the lower energy level rapidly becomes highly populated, preventing further lasing until those atoms relax to the ground state. These lasers, such as the excimer laser and the copper vapor laser, can never be operated in CW mode.

== History ==
=== Foundations ===
In 1917, Albert Einstein established the theoretical foundations for the laser and the maser in the paper "Zur Quantentheorie der Strahlung" ("On the Quantum Theory of Radiation") via a re-derivation of Max Planck's law of radiation, conceptually based upon probability coefficients (Einstein coefficients) for the absorption, spontaneous emission, and stimulated emission of electromagnetic radiation. In 1928, Rudolf W. Ladenburg confirmed the existence of the phenomena of stimulated emission and negative absorption. In 1939, Valentin A. Fabrikant predicted using stimulated emission to amplify "short" waves. In 1947, Willis E. Lamb and R. C. Retherford found apparent stimulated emission in hydrogen spectra and effected the first demonstration of stimulated emission. In 1950, Alfred Kastler (Nobel Prize for Physics 1966) proposed the method of optical pumping, which was experimentally demonstrated two years later by Brossel, Kastler, and Winter.

=== Maser ===
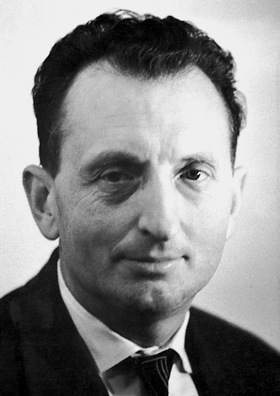
Aleksandr Prokhorov

In 1951, Joseph Weber submitted a paper on using stimulated emissions to make a microwave amplifier to the June 1952 Institute of Radio Engineers Vacuum Tube Research Conference in Ottawa, Ontario, Canada. After this presentation, RCA asked Weber to give a seminar on this idea, and Charles H. Townes asked him for a copy of the paper.

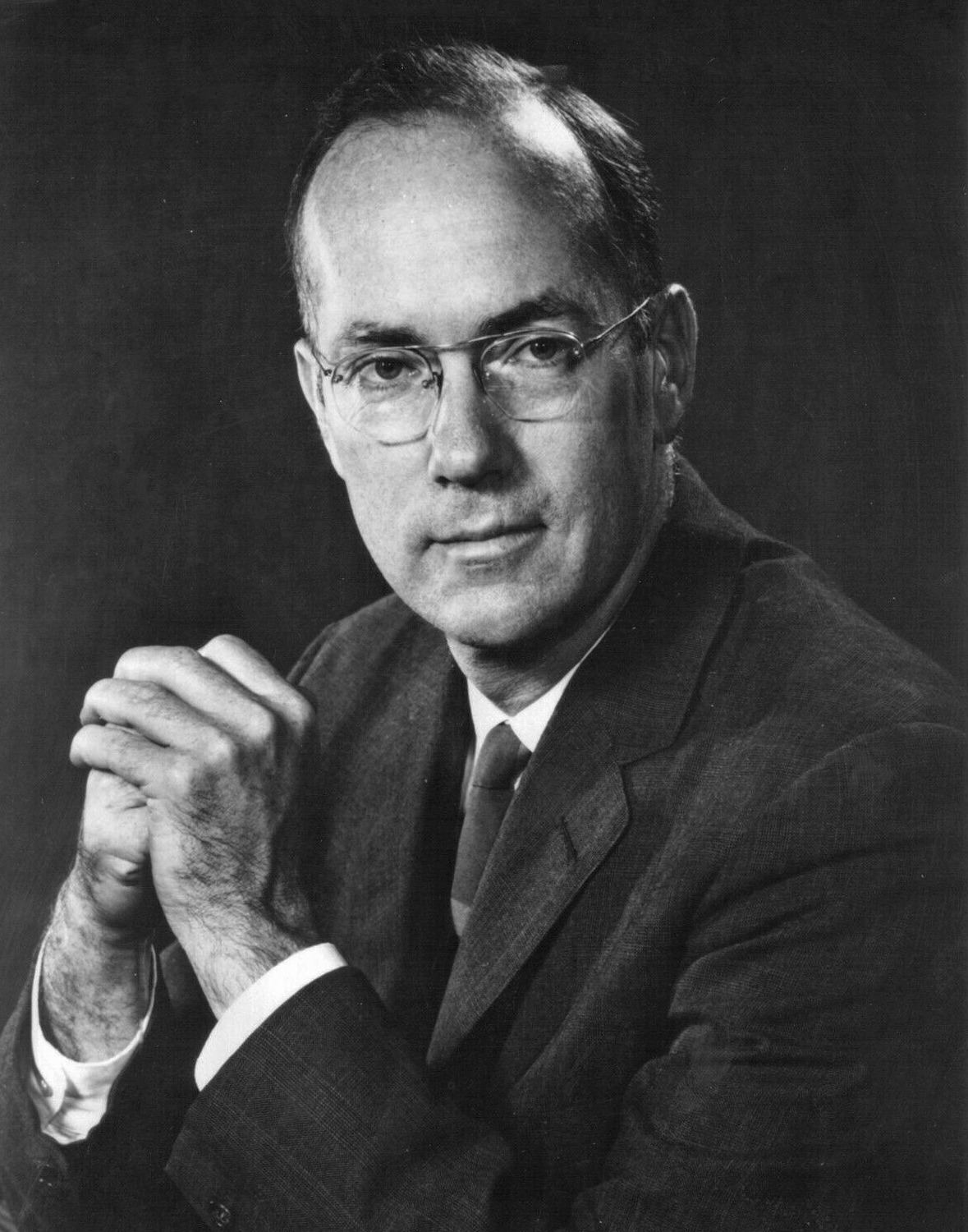
Charles H. Townes

In 1953, Charles H. Townes and graduate students James P. Gordon and Herbert J. Zeiger produced the first microwave amplifier, a device operating on similar principles to the laser, but amplifying microwave radiation rather than infrared or visible radiation. Townes's maser was incapable of continuous output. Meanwhile, in the Soviet Union, Nikolay Basov and Aleksandr Prokhorov were independently working on the quantum oscillator and solved the problem of continuous-output systems by using more than two energy levels. These gain media could release stimulated emissions between an excited state and a lower excited state, not the ground state, facilitating the maintenance of a population inversion. In 1955, Prokhorov and Basov suggested optical pumping of a multi-level system as a method for obtaining the population inversion, later a main method of laser pumping.

Townes reports that several eminent physicists—among them Niels Bohr, John von Neumann, and Llewellyn Thomas—argued the maser violated Heisenberg's uncertainty principle and hence could not work. Others such as Isidor Rabi and Polykarp Kusch expected that it would be impractical and not worth the effort. In 1964, Charles H. Townes, Nikolay Basov, and Aleksandr Prokhorov shared the Nobel Prize in Physics, "for fundamental work in the field of quantum electronics, which has led to the construction of oscillators and amplifiers based on the maser–laser principle".

=== Laser ===
External audio
- "The Man, the Myth, the Laser", Distillations Podcast, Science History Institute

In 1957 Charles H. Townes and Arthur Leonard Schawlow, then at Bell Labs, began a serious study of infrared "optical masers". As ideas developed, they abandoned infrared radiation to instead concentrate on visible light.

LASER notebook: First page of the notebook wherein Gordon Gould coined the acronym LASER, and described the elements required to construct one. Manuscript text: "Some rough calculations on the feasibility / of a LASER: Light Amplification by Stimulated / Emission of Radiation. / Conceive a tube terminated by optically flat / [Sketch of a tube] / partially reflecting parallel mirrors..."

Simultaneously, Columbia University graduate student Gordon Gould was working on a doctoral thesis about the energy levels of excited thallium. Gould and Townes met and talked about radiation emission as a general subject, but not the specific work they were pursuing. Later, in November 1957, Gould noted his ideas for how a "laser" could be made, including using an open resonator (an essential laser-device component). His notebook included a diagram of an optically pumped laser. It also contained the first recorded use of the term "laser," an acronym for "light amplification by stimulated emission of radiation," along with suggestions for potential applications of the coherent light beams described.

In 1958, Bell Labs filed a patent application for Schawlow and Townes's proposed optical maser; and Schawlow and Townes published a paper with their theoretical calculations in the Physical Review. That same year, Prokhorov independently proposed using an open resonator, the first published appearance of this idea.

Gould's notes included possible applications for a laser, such as optical telecommunications, spectrometry, interferometry, radar, and nuclear fusion. He continued developing the idea and filed a patent application in April 1959. The United States Patent and Trademark Office (USPTO) denied his application, and awarded a patent to Bell Labs, in 1960. That provoked a twenty-eight-year legal fight over the rights to various laser technologies and applications. Gould won his first patent in 1977 for optically pumped laser amplifiers, yet it was not until 1987 that he won his first significant patent infringement claim. Many aspects of a working laser were patented by different people: the question of just how to assign credit for inventing the laser remains unresolved by historians.

On May 16, 1960, Theodore H. Maiman operated the first functioning laser at Hughes Research Laboratories, Malibu, California, ahead of several research teams, including those of Townes, at Columbia University, Arthur L. Schawlow, at Bell Labs, and Gould, at the TRG (Technical Research Group) company. Maiman's functional laser used a flashlamp-pumped synthetic ruby crystal to produce red laser light at 694 nanometers wavelength. The device was only capable of pulsed operation, due to its three-level pumping design scheme. Later that year, the Iranian physicist Ali Javan, and William R. Bennett Jr., and Donald R. Herriott, constructed the first gas laser, using helium and neon that was capable of continuous operation in the infrared (U.S. Patent 3,149,290); later, Javan received the Albert Einstein World Award of Science in 1993. In 1962, Robert N. Hall demonstrated the first semiconductor laser, which was made of gallium arsenide and emitted in the near-infrared band of the spectrum at 850 nm. Later that year, Nick Holonyak Jr. demonstrated the first semiconductor laser with a visible emission. This first semiconductor laser could only be used in pulsed-beam operation, and when cooled to liquid nitrogen temperatures (77 K). In 1964, C. Kumar N. Patel at Bell Telephone Laboratories invented the carbon-dioxide (CO2) laser, the first high-power continuous-wave gas laser, which went on to become one of the most widely used industrial and medical lasers. In 1970, Zhores Alferov, in the USSR, and Izuo Hayashi and Morton Panish of Bell Labs also independently developed room-temperature, continual-operation diode lasers, using the heterojunction structure.

=== Recent innovations ===
Graph showing the history of maximum laser pulse intensity since 1960

Since the early period of laser history, laser research has produced a variety of improved and specialized laser types, optimized for different performance goals, including:

- new wavelength bands
- maximum average output power
- maximum peak pulse energy
- maximum peak pulse power
- minimum output pulse duration
- minimum linewidth
- maximum power efficiency
- minimum cost

Research on improving these aspects of lasers continues to this day.

In 2015, researchers made a white laser, whose light is modulated by a synthetic nanosheet made out of zinc, cadmium, sulfur, and selenium that can emit red, green, and blue light in varying proportions, with each wavelength spanning 191 nm.

In 2017, researchers at the Delft University of Technology demonstrated an AC Josephson junction microwave laser. Since the laser operates in the superconducting regime, it is more stable than other semiconductor-based lasers. The device has the potential for applications in quantum computing. In 2017, researchers at the Technical University of Munich demonstrated the smallest mode locking laser capable of emitting pairs of phase-locked picosecond laser pulses with a repetition frequency up to 200 GHz.

In 2017, researchers from the Physikalisch-Technische Bundesanstalt (PTB), together with US researchers from JILA, a joint institute of the National Institute of Standards and Technology (NIST) and the University of Colorado Boulder, established a new world record by developing an erbium-doped fiber laser with a linewidth of only 10 millihertz.

== Types and operating principles ==
Wavelengths of commercially available lasers. Laser types with distinct laser lines are shown above the wavelength bar, while below are shown lasers that can emit in a wavelength range. The color codifies the type of laser material (see the figure description for more details).

=== Gas lasers ===
Following the invention of the HeNe gas laser, many other gas discharges have been found to amplify light coherently. Gas lasers using many different gases have been built and used for many purposes. The helium–neon laser (HeNe) can operate at many different wavelengths, however, the vast majority are engineered to lase at 633 nm; these relatively low-cost but highly coherent lasers are extremely common in optical research and educational laboratories. Commercial carbon dioxide (CO_{2}) lasers can emit many hundreds of watts in a single spatial mode which can be concentrated into a tiny spot. This emission is in the thermal infrared at 10.6 μm; such lasers are regularly used in industry for cutting, welding, and medical applications. The efficiency of a CO_{2} laser is unusually high: over 30%. Argon-ion lasers can operate at several lasing transitions between 351 and 528.7 nm. Depending on the optical design one or more of these transitions can be lasing simultaneously; the most commonly used lines are 458 nm, 488 nm and 514.5 nm. A nitrogen transverse electrical discharge in gas at atmospheric pressure (TEA) laser is an inexpensive gas laser, often home-built by hobbyists, which produces rather incoherent UV light at 337.1 nm. Metal ion lasers are gas lasers that generate deep ultraviolet wavelengths. Helium-silver (HeAg) 224 nm and neon-copper (NeCu) 248 nm are two examples. Like all low-pressure gas lasers, the gain media of these lasers have quite narrow oscillation linewidths, less than 3 GHz (0.5 picometers), making them candidates for use in fluorescence suppressed Raman spectroscopy.

Lasing without maintaining the medium excited into a population inversion was demonstrated in 1992 in sodium gas and again in 1995 in rubidium gas by various international teams. This was accomplished by using an external maser to induce "optical transparency" in the medium by introducing and destructively interfering the ground electron transitions between two paths so that the likelihood for the ground electrons to absorb any energy has been canceled.

==== Chemical lasers ====
Chemical lasers are powered by a chemical reaction permitting a large amount of energy to be released quickly. Such very high-power lasers are especially of interest to the military; however continuous wave chemical lasers at very high power levels, fed by streams of gasses, have been developed and have some industrial applications. As examples, in the hydrogen fluoride laser (2700–2900 nm) and the deuterium fluoride laser (3800 nm) the reaction is the combination of hydrogen or deuterium gas with combustion products of ethylene in nitrogen trifluoride.

The first chemical laser was demonstrated in 1965 by Jerome V. V. Kasper and George C. Pimentel at the University of California, Berkeley. It was a hydrogen chloride laser operating at 3.7 micrometers.

==== Excimer lasers ====
Excimer lasers are a special sort of gas laser powered by an electric discharge in which the lasing medium is an excimer, or more precisely an exciplex in existing designs. These are molecules that can only exist with one atom in an excited electronic state. Once the molecule transfers its excitation energy to a photon, its atoms are no longer bound to each other, and the molecule disintegrates. This drastically reduces the population of the lower energy state thus greatly facilitating a population inversion. Excimers currently used are all noble gas compounds; noble gasses are chemically inert and can only form compounds while in an excited state. Excimer lasers typically operate at ultraviolet wavelengths, with major applications including semiconductor photolithography and LASIK eye surgery. Commonly used excimer molecules include ArF (emission at 193 nm), KrCl (222 nm), KrF (248 nm), XeCl (308 nm), and XeF (351 nm). The molecular fluorine laser, emitting at 157 nm in the vacuum ultraviolet, is sometimes referred to as an excimer laser; however, this appears to be a misnomer since F_{2} is a stable compound.

=== Solid-state lasers ===
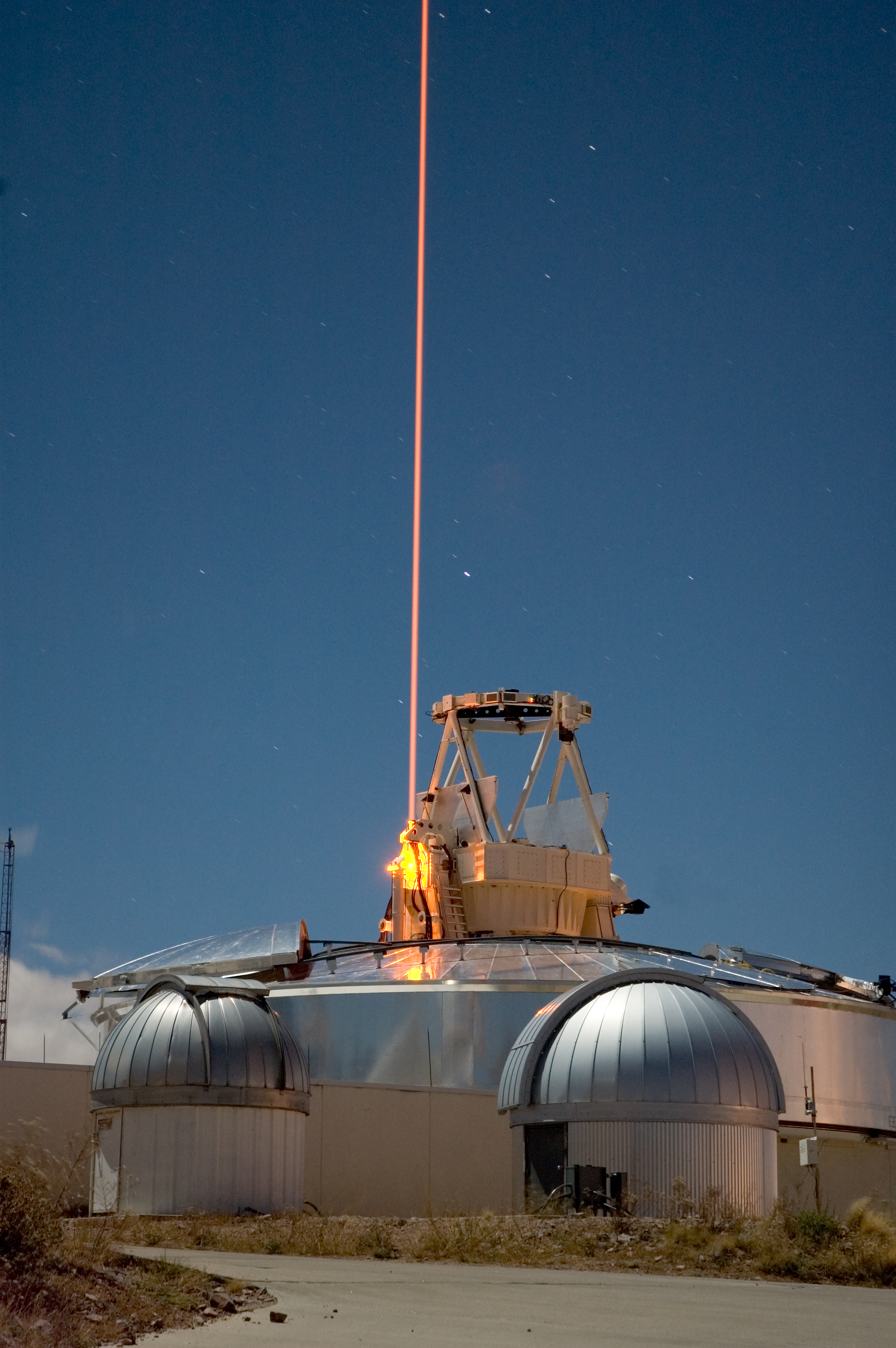
A 50 W FASOR, based on a Nd:YAG laser, used at the Starfire Optical Range

Solid-state lasers use a crystalline or glass rod that is "doped" with ions that provide the required energy states. For example, the first working laser was a ruby laser, made from ruby (chromium-doped corundum). The population inversion is maintained in the dopant. These materials are pumped optically using a shorter wavelength than the lasing wavelength, often from a flash tube or another laser. The usage of the term "solid-state" in laser physics is narrower than in typical use. Semiconductor lasers (laser diodes) are typically not referred to as solid-state lasers.

Neodymium is a common dopant in various solid-state laser crystals, including yttrium orthovanadate (Nd:YVO_{4}), yttrium lithium fluoride (Nd:YLF) and yttrium aluminium garnet (Nd:YAG). All these lasers can produce high powers in the infrared spectrum at 1064 nm. They are used for cutting, welding, and marking of metals and other materials, and also in spectroscopy and for pumping dye lasers. These lasers are also commonly doubled, tripled or quadrupled in frequency to produce 532 nm (green, visible), 355 nm and 266 nm (UV) beams, respectively. Frequency-doubled diode-pumped solid-state (DPSS) lasers are used to make low power (<10 mW) bright green laser pointers, and high power (>3 W) medical lasers.

Ytterbium, holmium, thulium, and erbium are other common "dopants" in solid-state lasers. Ytterbium is used in crystals such as Yb:YAG, Yb:KGW, Yb:KYW, Yb:SYS, Yb:BOYS, Yb:CaF_{2}, typically operating around 1020–1050 nm. They are potentially very efficient and high-powered due to a small quantum defect. Extremely high powers in ultrashort pulses can be achieved with Yb:YAG. Holmium-doped YAG crystals emit at 2097 nm and form an efficient laser operating at infrared wavelengths strongly absorbed by water-bearing tissues. The Ho-YAG is usually operated in a pulsed mode and passed through optical fiber surgical devices to resurface joints, remove rot from teeth, vaporize cancers, and pulverize kidney and gall stones.

Titanium-doped sapphire (Ti:sapphire) produces a highly tunable infrared laser, commonly used for spectroscopy. It is also notable for use as a mode-locked laser producing ultrashort pulses of extremely high peak power.

Optical parametric oscillators shift the wavelength of solid-state lasers across the spectrum from ultraviolet to infrared. Non-critically phase-matched OPOs can convert laser wavelengths with up to 70% efficiency, creating highly efficient lasers at so-called "eyesafe" wavelengths that enabled lasers to be used safely in public without eye damage.

Thermal limitations in solid-state lasers arise from unconverted pump power that heats the medium. This heat, when coupled with a high thermo-optic coefficient (dn/dT) can cause thermal lensing and reduce the quantum efficiency. Diode-pumped thin disk lasers overcome these issues by having a gain medium that is much thinner than the diameter of the pump beam. This allows for a more uniform temperature in the material. Thin disk lasers have been shown to produce beams of up to one kilowatt.

=== Fiber lasers ===
Solid-state lasers or laser amplifiers where the light is guided due to the total internal reflection in a single mode optical fiber are instead called fiber lasers. Guiding of light allows extremely long gain regions, providing good cooling conditions; fibers have a high surface area to volume ratio which allows efficient cooling. In addition, the fiber's waveguiding properties tend to reduce thermal distortion of the beam. Erbium and ytterbium ions are common active species in such lasers.

Quite often, the fiber laser is designed as a double-clad fiber. This type of fiber consists of a fiber core, an inner cladding, and an outer cladding. The index of the three concentric layers is chosen so that the fiber core acts as a single-mode fiber for the laser emission while the outer cladding acts as a highly multimode core for the pump laser. This lets the pump propagate a large amount of power into and through the active inner core region while still having a high numerical aperture (NA) to have easy launching conditions.

Pump light can be used more efficiently by creating a fiber disk laser, or a stack of such lasers.

Fiber lasers, like other optical media, can suffer from the effects of photodarkening when they are exposed to radiation of certain wavelengths. In particular, this can lead to degradation of the material and loss in laser functionality over time. The exact causes and effects of this phenomenon vary from material to material, although it often involves the formation of color centers.

=== Photonic crystal lasers ===
Photonic crystal lasers are lasers based on nano-structures that provide the mode confinement and the density of optical states (DOS) structure required for the feedback to take place. They are typical micrometer-sized and tunable on the bands of the photonic crystals.

=== Semiconductor lasers ===
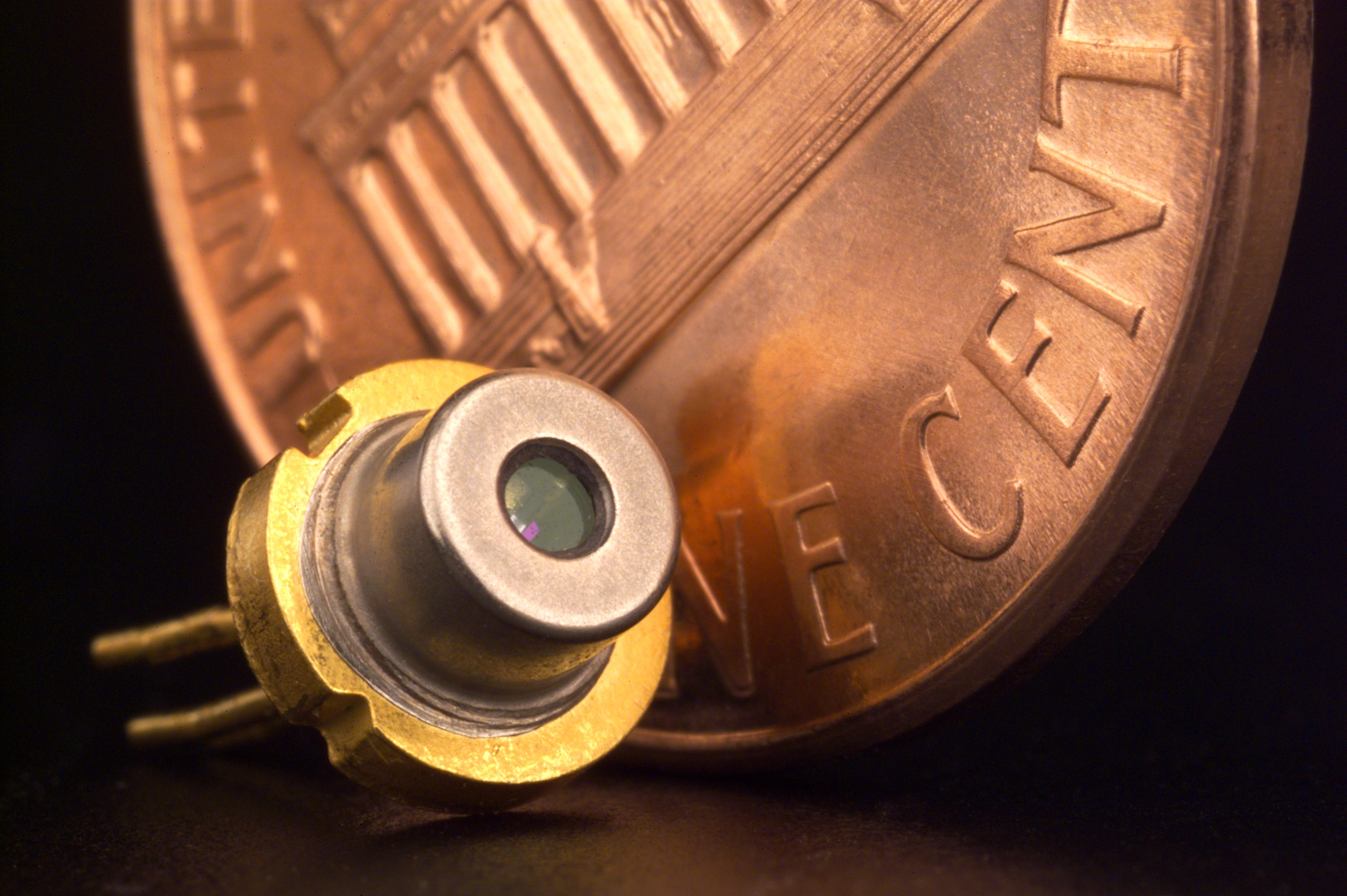
A 5.6 mm 'closed can' commercial laser diode, such as those used in a CD or DVD player

Semiconductor lasers are diodes that are electrically pumped. Recombination of electrons and holes created by the applied current introduces optical gain. Reflection from the ends of the crystal forms an optical resonator, although the resonator can be external to the semiconductor in some designs.

Commercial laser diodes emit at wavelengths from 375 nm to 3500 nm. Low to medium power laser diodes are used in laser pointers, laser printers and CD/DVD players. Laser diodes are also frequently used to optically pump other lasers with high efficiency. The highest-power industrial laser diodes, with power of up to 20 kW, are used in industry for cutting and welding. External-cavity semiconductor lasers have a semiconductor active medium in a larger cavity. These devices can generate high power outputs with good beam quality, wavelength-tunable narrow-linewidth radiation, or ultrashort laser pulses.

In 2012, Nichia and OSRAM developed and manufactured commercial high-power green laser diodes (515/520 nm), which compete with traditional diode-pumped solid-state lasers.

Vertical cavity surface-emitting lasers (VCSELs) are semiconductor lasers whose emission direction is perpendicular to the surface of the wafer. VCSEL devices typically have a more circular output beam than conventional laser diodes. As of 2005, only 850 nm VCSELs are widely available, with 1300 nm VCSELs beginning to be commercialized and 1550 nm devices being an area of research. VECSELs are external-cavity VCSELs. Quantum cascade lasers are semiconductor lasers that have an active transition between energy sub-bands of an electron in a structure containing several quantum wells.

The development of a silicon laser is important in the field of optical computing. Silicon is the material of choice for integrated circuits, and so electronic and silicon photonic components (such as optical interconnects) could be fabricated on the same chip. Unfortunately, silicon is a difficult lasing material to deal with, since it has certain properties which block lasing. However, recently teams have produced silicon lasers through methods such as fabricating the lasing material from silicon and other semiconductor materials, such as indium(III) phosphide or gallium(III) arsenide, materials that allow coherent light to be produced from silicon. These are called hybrid silicon lasers. Recent developments have also shown the use of monolithically integrated nanowire lasers directly on silicon for optical interconnects, paving the way for chip-level applications. These heterostructure nanowire lasers capable of optical interconnects in silicon are also capable of emitting pairs of phase-locked picosecond pulses with a repetition frequency up to 200 GHz, allowing for on-chip optical signal processing. Another type is a Raman laser, which takes advantage of Raman scattering to produce a laser from materials such as silicon.

Semiconductor quantum dot lasers use quantum dots as the active laser medium. These lasers exhibit device performance that is closer to gas lasers and avoid some of the disadvantages of traditional semiconductor laser media. Improvements in modulation bandwidth, lasing threshold, relative intensity noise, linewidth enhancement factor and temperature insensitivity have all been observed. The quantum dot active region may also be engineered to operate at different wavelengths by varying dot size and composition. This allows quantum dot lasers to be fabricated to operate at wavelengths previously not possible using semiconductor laser technology.

=== Dye lasers ===
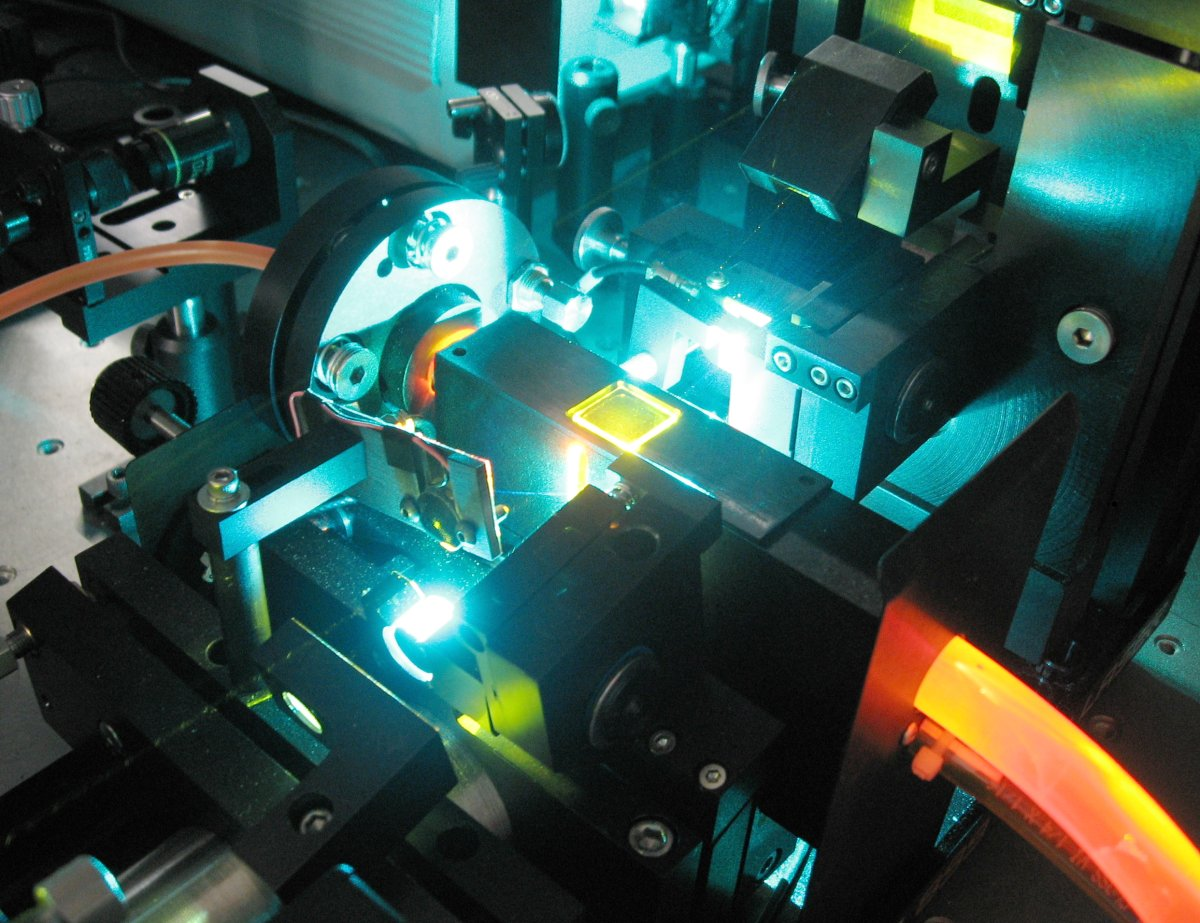
Close-up of a table-top dye laser based on Rhodamine 6G

Dye lasers use an organic dye as the gain medium. The wide gain spectrum of available dyes, or mixtures of dyes, allows these lasers to be highly tunable, or to produce very short-duration pulses (on the order of a few femtoseconds). Although these tunable lasers are mainly known in their liquid form, researchers have also demonstrated narrow-linewidth tunable emission in dispersive oscillator configurations incorporating solid-state dye gain media. In their most prevalent form, these solid-state dye lasers use dye-doped polymers as laser media.

Bubble lasers are dye lasers that use a bubble as the optical resonator. Whispering gallery modes in the bubble produce an output spectrum composed of hundreds of evenly spaced peaks: a frequency comb. The spacing of the whispering gallery modes is directly related to the bubble circumference, allowing bubble lasers to be used as highly sensitive pressure sensors.

=== Free-electron lasers ===
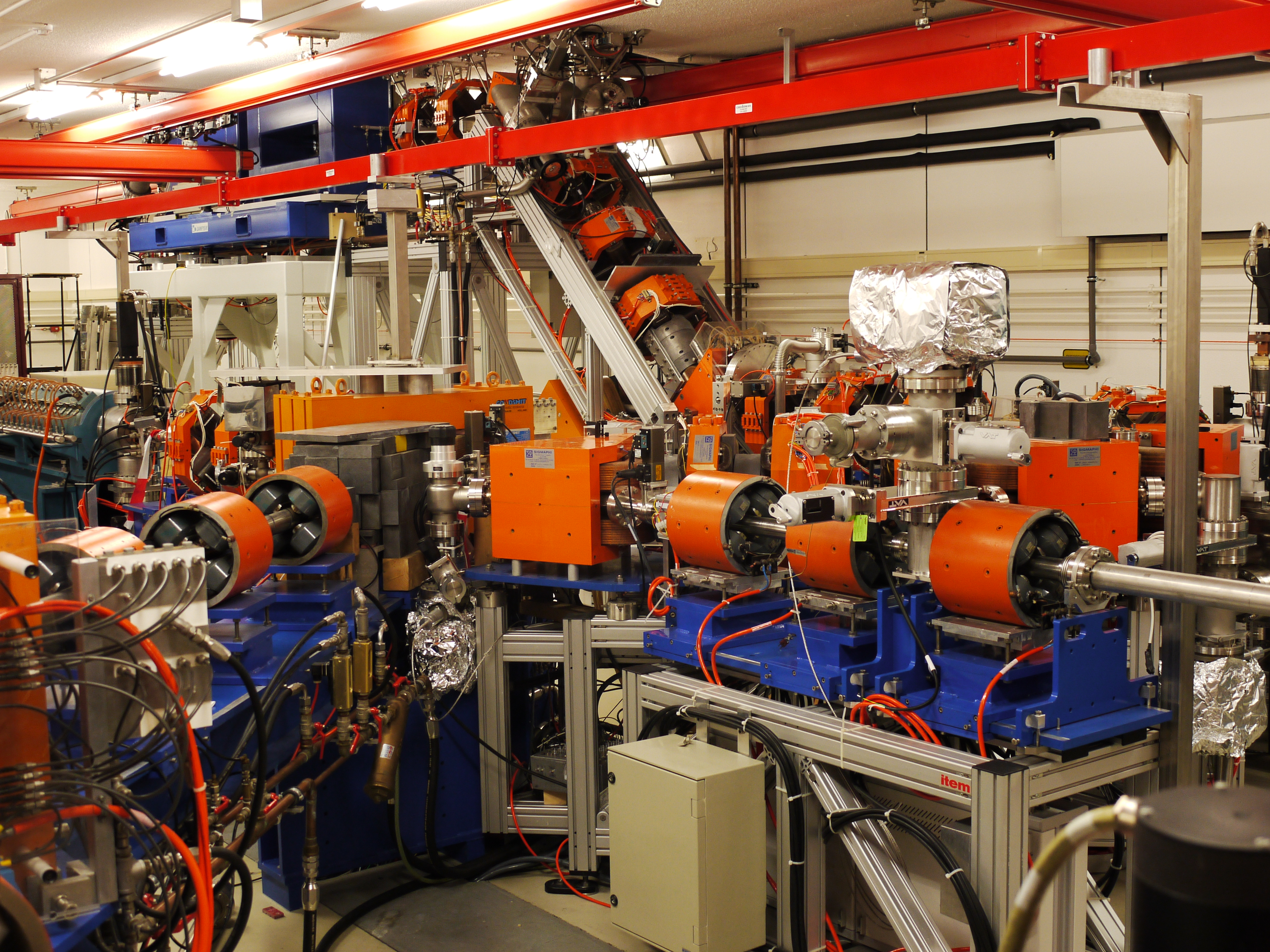
The free-electron laser FELIX at the FOM Institute for Plasma Physics Rijnhuizen, Nieuwegein

Free-electron lasers (FEL) generate coherent, high-power radiation that is widely tunable, currently ranging in wavelength from microwaves through terahertz radiation and infrared to the visible spectrum, to soft X-rays. They have the widest frequency range of any laser type. While FEL beams share the same optical traits as other lasers, such as coherent radiation, FEL operation is quite different. Unlike gas, liquid, or solid-state lasers, which rely on bound atomic or molecular states, FELs use a relativistic electron beam as the lasing medium, hence the term free-electron.

=== Exotic media ===
The pursuit of a high-quantum-energy laser using transitions between isomeric states of an atomic nucleus has been the subject of wide-ranging academic research since the early 1970s. Much of this is summarized in three review articles. This research has been international in scope but mainly based in the former Soviet Union and the United States. While many scientists remain optimistic that a breakthrough is near, an operational gamma-ray laser is yet to be realized.

Some of the early studies were directed toward short pulses of neutrons exciting the upper isomer state in a solid so the gamma-ray transition could benefit from the line-narrowing of Mössbauer effect. In conjunction, several advantages were expected from two-stage pumping of a three-level system. It was conjectured that the nucleus of an atom embedded in the near field of a laser-driven coherently-oscillating electron cloud would experience a larger dipole field than that of the driving laser. Furthermore, the nonlinearity of the oscillating cloud would produce both spatial and temporal harmonics, so nuclear transitions of higher multipolarity could also be driven at multiples of the laser frequency.

In September 2007, the BBC News reported that there was speculation about the possibility of using positronium annihilation to drive a very powerful gamma ray laser. David Cassidy of the University of California, Riverside proposed that a single such laser could be used to ignite a nuclear fusion reaction, replacing the banks of hundreds of lasers currently employed in inertial confinement fusion experiments.

Space-based X-ray lasers pumped by nuclear explosions have also been proposed as antimissile weapons. Such devices would be one-shot weapons.

Living cells have been used to produce laser light. The cells were genetically engineered to produce green fluorescent protein, which served as the laser's gain medium. The cells were then placed between two 20-micrometer-wide mirrors, which acted as the laser cavity. When the cell was illuminated with blue light, it emitted intensely directed green laser light.

=== Natural lasers ===
Like astrophysical masers, irradiated planetary or stellar gases may amplify light producing a natural laser. Mars, Venus, and MWC 349 exhibit this phenomenon.

== Field of study ==
Laser science or laser physics studies lasers, both through theory and practice. Laser science is principally concerned with quantum electronics, laser construction, optical cavity design, the physics of producing a population inversion in laser media, and the temporal evolution of the light field in the laser. It is also concerned with the physics of laser beam propagation, particularly the physics of Gaussian beams, with laser applications, and with associated fields such as nonlinear optics and quantum optics.

== Uses ==
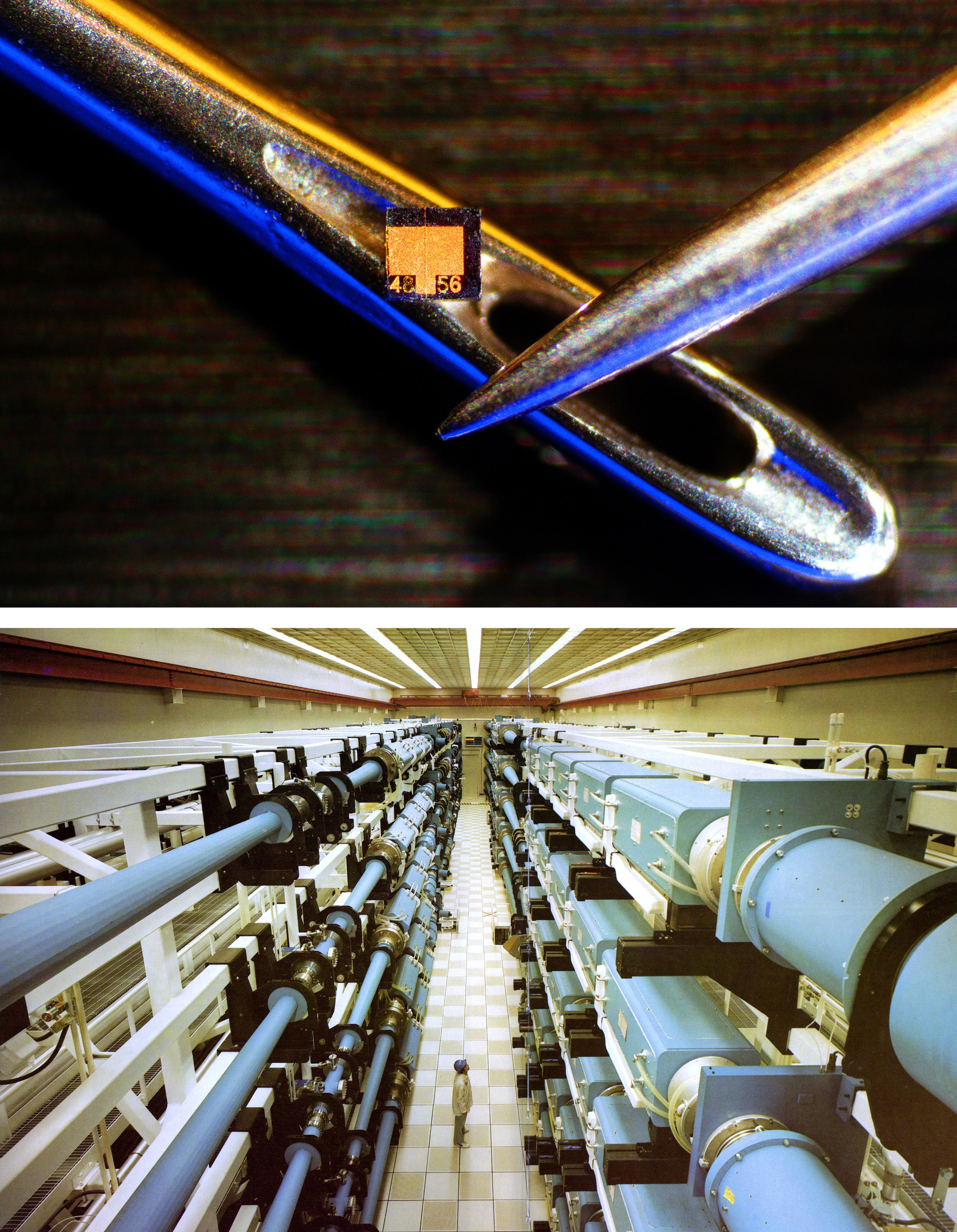
Lasers range in size from microscopic diode lasers (top) with numerous applications, to football field sized neodymium glass lasers (bottom) used for inertial confinement fusion, nuclear weapons research and other high energy density physics experiments

When the laser was first invented, it was called "a solution looking for a problem", although Gould noted numerous possible applications in his notebook and patent applications. Since then, they have become ubiquitous, finding utility in thousands of highly varied applications in every section of modern society, including consumer electronics, information technology, science, medicine, industry, law enforcement, entertainment, and the military. Fiber-optic communication relies on multiplexed lasers in dense wave-division multiplexing (WDM) systems to transmit large amounts of data over long distances.

The first widely noticeable use of lasers was the supermarket barcode scanner, introduced in 1974. The laserdisc player, introduced in 1978, was the first successful consumer product to include a laser, but the compact disc player was the first laser-equipped device to become common, commercialized in 1982, followed shortly by laser printers.

Some other uses are:

- Communications: besides fiber-optic communication, lasers are used for free-space optical communication, including laser communication in space
- Medicine: see below
- Industry: cutting including converting thin materials, welding, material heat treatment, marking parts (engraving and bonding), additive manufacturing or 3D printing processes such as selective laser sintering and selective laser melting, laser metal deposition, and non-contact measurement of parts and 3D scanning, and laser cleaning.
- Military: marking targets, guiding munitions, missile defense, electro-optical countermeasures (EOCM), lidar, blinding troops, firearms sights. See below
- Law enforcement: LIDAR traffic enforcement. Lasers are used for latent fingerprint detection in the forensic identification field
- Research: spectroscopy, laser ablation, laser annealing, laser scattering, laser interferometry, lidar, laser capture microdissection, fluorescence microscopy, metrology, laser cooling
- Commercial products: laser printers, barcode scanners, thermometers, laser pointers, holograms, bubblegrams
- Entertainment: optical discs, laser lighting displays, laser turntables.
- Informational markings: Laser lighting display technology can be used to project informational markings onto surfaces such as playing fields, roads, runways, or warehouse floors.

In 2004, excluding diode lasers, approximately 131,000 lasers were sold, with a value of US$2.19 billion. In the same year, approximately 733 million diode lasers, valued at US$3.20 billion, were sold. Global Industrial laser sales in 2023 reached $21.85 billion.

=== In medicine ===
Lasers have many uses in medicine, including laser surgery (particularly eye surgery), curing blindness, laser healing (photobiomodulation therapy), kidney stone treatment, ophthalmoscopy, and cosmetic skin treatments such as acne treatment, cellulite and striae reduction, and hair removal.

Lasers are used to treat cancer by shrinking or destroying tumors or precancerous growths. They are most commonly used to treat superficial cancers that are on the surface of the body or the lining of internal organs. They are used to treat basal cell skin cancer and the very early stages of others like cervical, penile, vaginal, vulvar, and non-small cell lung cancer. Laser therapy is often combined with other treatments, such as surgery, chemotherapy, or radiation therapy. Laser-induced interstitial thermotherapy (LITT), or interstitial laser photocoagulation, uses lasers to treat some cancers using hyperthermia, which uses heat to shrink tumors by damaging or killing cancer cells. Lasers are more precise than traditional surgery methods and cause less damage, pain, bleeding, swelling, and scarring. A disadvantage is that surgeons must acquire specialized training, and thus it will likely be more expensive than other treatments.

Low-level laser therapy (LLLT) is a treatment in which low-power light from lasers or light-emitting diodes (LEDs) is applied to the surface of the body. This is claimed to stimulate healing, relieve pain, and enhance cell function. The effects appear to be limited to specific wavelengths of light. The effectiveness of this form of treatment is still under investigation. Repeated low-level red light therapy may be effective for controlling myopia in children. Several such devices are cleared by the United States Food and Drug Administration (FDA), and low level red light therapy is being tested for treating a range of medical problems including rheumatoid arthritis and oral mucositis.

=== As weapons ===
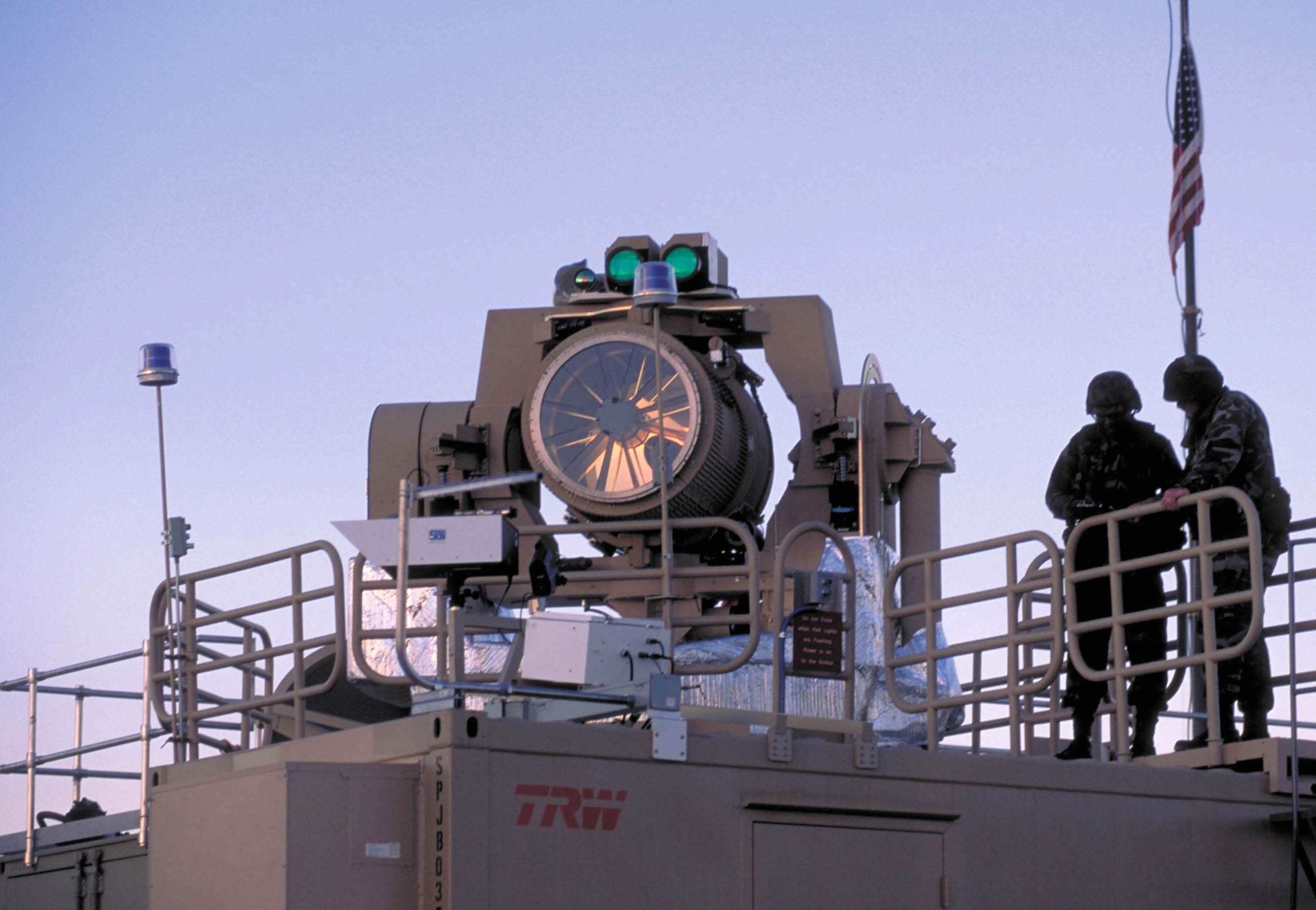
The US–Israeli Tactical High Energy weapon has been used to shoot down rockets and artillery shells

A laser weapon is a type of directed-energy weapon that uses lasers to inflict damage. Whether they will be deployed as practical, high-performance military weapons remains to be seen. One of the major issues with laser weapons is atmospheric thermal blooming, which is still largely unsolved. This issue is exacerbated when there is fog, smoke, dust, rain, snow, smog, foam, or purposely dispersed obscurant chemicals present. The United States Navy has tested the very short range (1 mile), 30-kW Laser Weapon System or LaWS to be used against targets like small UAVs, rocket-propelled grenades, and visible motorboat or helicopter engines. It has been described as "six welding lasers strapped together." A 60 kW system, HELIOS, is being developed for destroyer-class ships as of 2020.

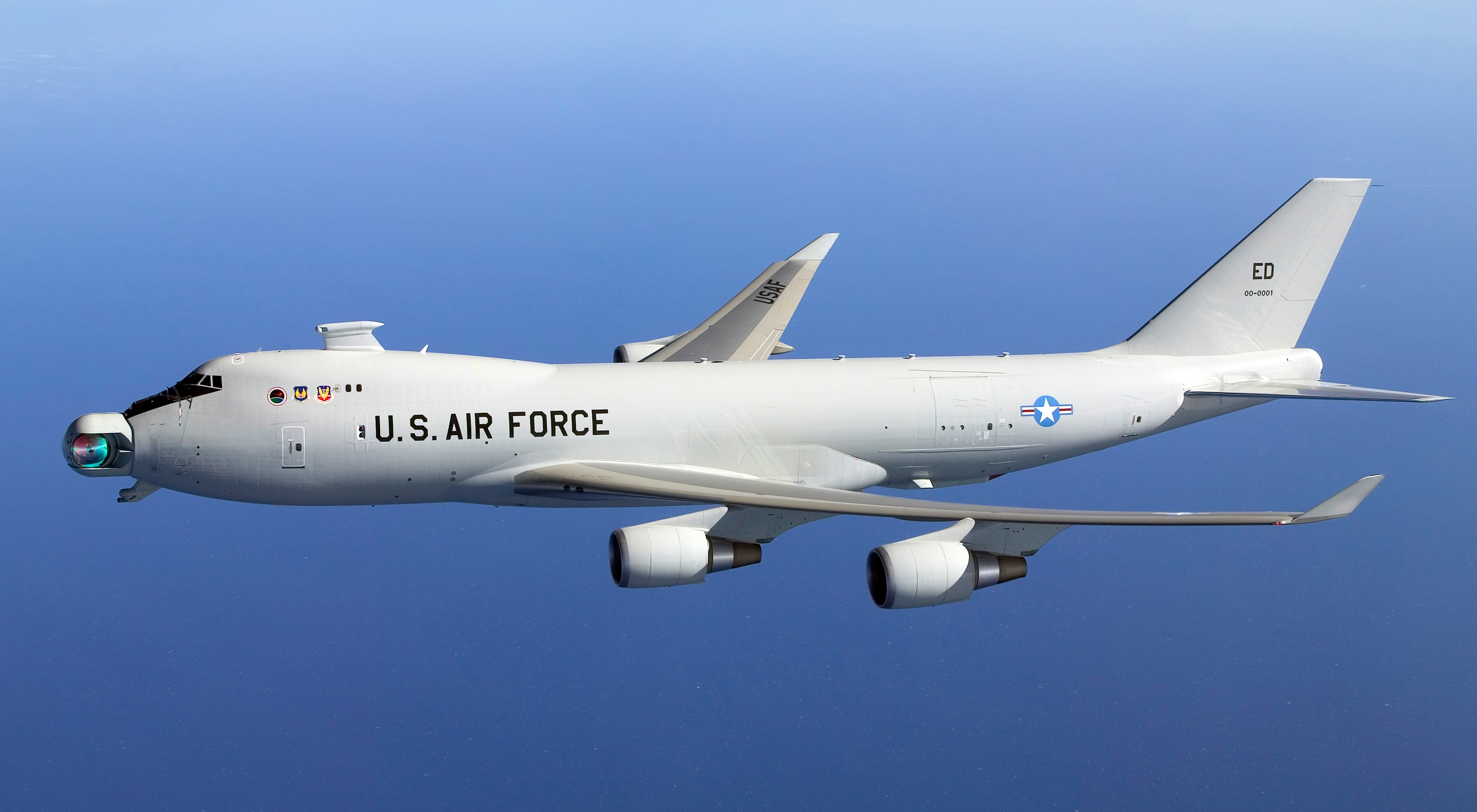
The YAL-1, a modified Boeing 747 with a laser weapon on board. It was canceled in December 2011 and scrapped in September 2014.

Lasers can be used as incapacitating non-lethal weapons. They can cause temporary or permanent vision loss when directed at the eyes. Even lasers with a power output of less than one watt can cause immediate and permanent vision loss under certain conditions, making them potentially non-lethal but incapacitating weapons. The use of such lasers is morally controversial due to the extreme handicap that laser-induced blindness represents. The Protocol on Blinding Laser Weapons bans the use of weapons designed to cause permanent blindness. Weapons designed to cause temporary blindness, known as dazzlers, are used by military and sometimes law enforcement organizations.

=== Hobbies ===
In recent years, some hobbyists have taken an interest in lasers. Lasers used by hobbyists are generally of class IIIa or IIIb, although some have made their own class IV types. However, due to the cost and potential dangers, this is an uncommon hobby. Some hobbyists salvage laser diodes from broken DVD players (red), Blu-ray players (violet), or even higher power laser diodes from CD or DVD burners.

Hobbyists have also used surplus lasers taken from retired military applications and modified them for holography. Pulsed ruby and YAG lasers work well for this application.

=== Examples by power ===
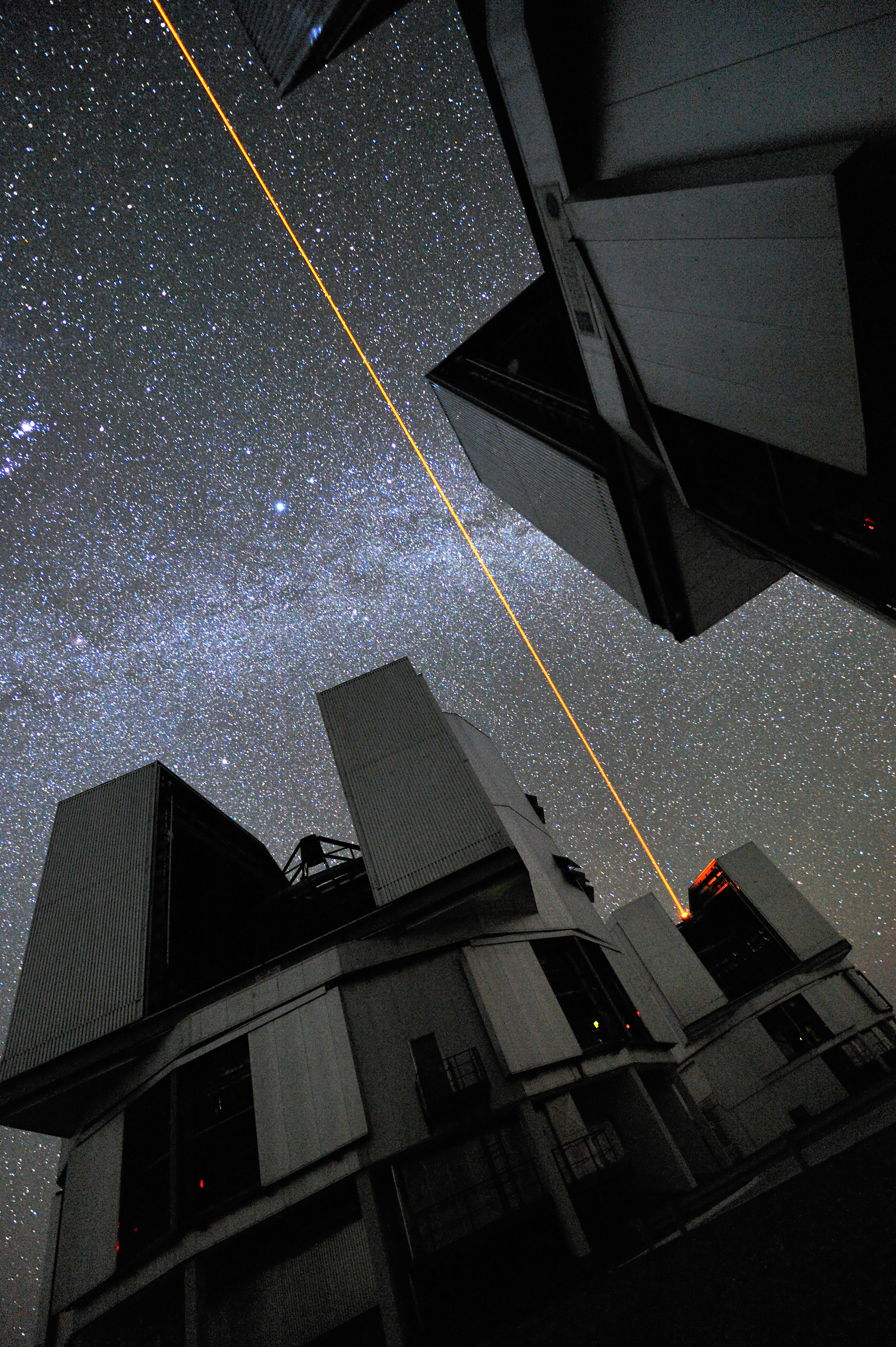
Laser application in astronomical adaptive optics imaging

Different applications need lasers with different output powers. Lasers that produce a continuous beam or a series of short pulses can be compared on the basis of their average power. Lasers that produce pulses can also be characterized based on the peak power of each pulse. The peak power of a pulsed laser is many orders of magnitude greater than its average power. The average output power is always less than the power consumed.

The continuous or average power required for some uses:
Power	Use
1–5 mW	Laser pointers
5 mW	CD-ROM drive
5–10 mW	DVD player or DVD-ROM drive
100 mW	High-speed CD-RW burner
250 mW	Consumer 16× DVD-R burner
400 mW	DVD 24× dual-layer recording
1 W	Green laser in Holographic Versatile Disc prototype development
1–20 W	Output of the majority of commercially available solid-state lasers used for micro machining
30–100 W	Typical sealed CO_{2} surgical lasers
100–3000 W	Typical sealed CO_{2} lasers used in industrial laser cutting

Examples of pulsed systems with high peak power:

- 700 TW (700×10^{12} W)—National Ignition Facility, a 192-beam, 1.8-megajoule laser system adjoining a 10-meter-diameter target chamber
- 10 PW (10×10^{15} W)—world's most powerful laser as of 2019, located at the ELI-NP facility in Măgurele, Romania.

== Safety ==
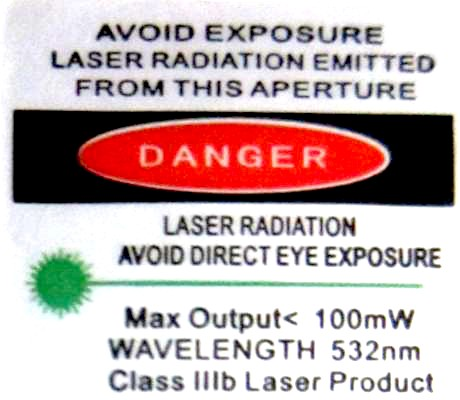
Left: European laser warning symbol required for Class 2 lasers and higher. Right: US laser warning label, in this case for a Class 3B laser

Even the first laser was recognized as being potentially dangerous. Theodore Maiman characterized the first laser as having the power of one "Gillette", as it could burn through one Gillette razor blade. Today, it is accepted that even low-power lasers with only a few milliwatts of output power can be hazardous to human eyesight when the beam hits the eye directly or after reflection from a shiny surface. At wavelengths which the cornea and the lens can focus well, the coherence and low divergence of laser light means that it can be focused by the eye into an extremely small spot on the retina, resulting in localized burning and permanent damage in seconds or even less time.

Lasers are usually labeled with a safety class number, which identifies how dangerous the laser is:

- Class 1 is inherently safe, usually because the light is contained in an enclosure, for example in CD players
- Class 2 is safe during normal use; the blink reflex of the eye will prevent damage. Usually up to 1 mW power, for example, laser pointers.
- Class 3R (formerly IIIa) lasers are usually up to 5 mW and involve a small risk of eye damage within the time of the blink reflex. Staring into such a beam for several seconds is likely to cause damage to a spot on the retina.
- Class 3B lasers (5–499 mW) can cause immediate eye damage upon exposure.
- Class 4 lasers (≥ 500 mW) can burn skin, and in some cases, even scattered light from these lasers can cause eye and/or skin damage. Many industrial and scientific lasers are in this class.

The indicated powers are for visible-light, continuous-wave lasers. For pulsed lasers and invisible wavelengths, other power limits apply. People working with class 3B and class 4 lasers can protect their eyes with safety goggles which are designed to absorb light of a particular wavelength.

Infrared lasers with wavelengths longer than about 1.4 micrometers are often referred to as "eye-safe", because the cornea tends to absorb light at these wavelengths, protecting the retina from damage. The label "eye-safe" can be misleading, however, as it applies only to relatively low-power continuous wave beams; a high-power or Q-switched laser at these wavelengths can burn the cornea, causing severe eye damage, and even moderate-power lasers can injure the eye.

Lasers can be a hazard to both civil and military aviation, due to the potential to temporarily distract or blind pilots. See Lasers and aviation safety for more on this topic.

Cameras based on charge-coupled devices may be more sensitive to laser damage than biological eyes.

== See also ==
- Coherent perfect absorber
- Homogeneous broadening
- Laser linewidth
- List of laser articles
- List of light sources
- Nanolaser
- Sound amplification by stimulated emission of radiation
- Spaser
- Fabry–Pérot interferometer
- Ultrashort pulse laser
