= Symposium on Laser Physics =

Academic conference

Symposium on Laser Physics is an academic conference in the field of Laser Physics. SLP has been organized, once every four years since 1971.

== History ==
The first Symposium on Laser Physics took place from August 29 to September 5, 1971, on the campus of University of Isfahan, with the support and cooperation of Sharif University of Technology and Massachusetts Institute of Technology.

Ali Javan was director of the symposium, which was sponsored by the International Union of Pure and Applied Physics.
