= Irving P. Herman =

American applied physicist

- Born: 1951 (age 74–75)
- Citizenship: United States of America
- Known for: Laser isotope separation Optical diagnostics of thin films Assembly of nanocrystals 2D Materials
- Scientific career
- Institutions: Columbia University, Lawrence Livermore National Laboratory
- Academic advisors: Ali Javan
- Website: www.irvingpherman.com/

Irving Philip Herman (born 1951) is an American physicist and the Edwin Howard Armstrong Professor of Applied Physics at Columbia University. He is an elected Fellow of the American Physical Society and of Optica, the former for "distinguished accomplishments in laser physics, notably the development and application of laser techniques to probe and control materials processing".

== Education and career ==
Herman studied at MIT, earning a bachelor's degree in 1972 in physics. He received his doctorate in 1977 at MIT in physics and was a Fannie and John Hertz doctoral fellow. From 1977 to 1986 he was at the Lawrence Livermore National Laboratory, where he was a section leader. He has been at Columbia University since 1986, where he is now Edwin Howard Armstrong Professor of Applied Physics. He was department chair of the Columbia University Applied Physics and Applied Mathematics for nine years, and director of the Columbia University National Science Foundation (NSF) Materials Research Science and Engineering Center (MRSEC) for 12 years and of the NSF Optics and Quantum Electronics Integrative Graduate Education and Research Traineeship (IGERT) program for five years. He is a fellow of the American Physical Society and the Optical Society of America (now Optica).

== Research ==
Herman has advanced several fundamental aspects and applications of laser interactions with matter, optical diagnostics of thin film processing, including by real-time monitoring, and nanoscience, along with cited (excellent) collaborators. These and his related studies have improved understanding and control of the assembly and processing of materials for semiconductor and optical devices, and the properties of these thin films, nanomaterials and nanocomponents, such as colloidal nanocrystals. This includes advancing understanding the properties of nanomaterials, and the processing, assembly, and properties of nanocrystals, ultrathin van der Waals layers, and hybrids of them. More specifically, he used Raman scattering to analyze the phonon confinement and defects of ceria nanoparticles, which have important catalytic applications, and used optical methods to determine the structure of light-emitting porous silicon and of porous SiC. He fabricated large supercrystals containing over a million ordered nanocrystals at spatially-selective regions on a surface by using a microfluidics technique, showed how ordered monolayers of nanocrystals on surfaces form in real-time by using x-ray photoelectron spectroscopy (XPS), and assembled spatially patterned thick, smooth and conformal nanocrystal films by using spatially patterned DC electric fields (electrophoretic deposition), and demonstrated how film assembly and film mechanical and optical properties are guided by the coverage of the nanocrystals by ligands; He also used AC field gradients to precisely place carbon nanotubes (CNTs) at electrodes (dielectrophoretic deposition).

He advanced laser-assisted deposition and processing, and the real-time optical diagnostics of thin film processing, including that of surfaces during plasma etching by using laser thermal desorption of surface adsorbates, then detected by plasma-induced emission (PIE) and laser-induced fluorescence (LIF) and by combined or independent use real-time Raman microprobe scattering, direct laser writing and laser heating. The theme of many of these and his related studies are advanced semiconductor nanomaterials and heterostructures under unusual conditions, such as at high temperature, as caused by either laser heating or heating in ovens, or high or uncertain degrees of strain and strain, which might lead to fracture, as a result of laser heating, electrophoretic deposition, film adhesion during fabrication, or applied hydrostatic pressure. His studies of semiconductor and nanomaterial structures at high pressure used optical diagnostics to probe changes in epilayer strain and nanocrystal interactions in films. Earlier, he achieved ultrahigh single-step selectivity in the laser isotope separation of deuterium and tritium, to help the production and cleaning of heavy water for fission reactors. Even earlier, he was part of the team that first observed Dicke superradiance.

Herman has written three books ''Optical Diagnostics for Thin Film Processing'' is a comprehensive monograph. ''Physics of the Human Body'' is a text book on the physics and math of human physiology aimed for undergraduate, deriving from a class he developed for first-year undergraduates.''Coming Home to Math: Become Comfortable With The Numbers That Rule Your Life'' is a semi-popular book designed to make adults more at ease using math and quantitative thinking. He developed a series of interactive graduate-level seminars on Research and Professional Ethics, along with a set of ethics mini-case scenarios based on these seminars.
