= Lasing without inversion =

Laser generation technique

In laser science, lasing without inversion (LWI), or lasing without population inversion, is a technique used for laser beam generation without the requirement of population inversion. A laser working under this scheme exploits the quantum interference between the probability amplitudes of atomic transitions in order to eliminate absorption without disturbing the stimulated emission. This phenomenon is also the essence of electromagnetically induced transparency.

The basic LWI concept was first predicted by Ali Javan in 1956. The first demonstration of LWI was carried out by Marlan Scully in an experiment in rubidium and sodium at Texas A&M University, and then at NIST in Boulder, Colorado.
