= Ali Javan =

Iranian American physicist (1926–2016)

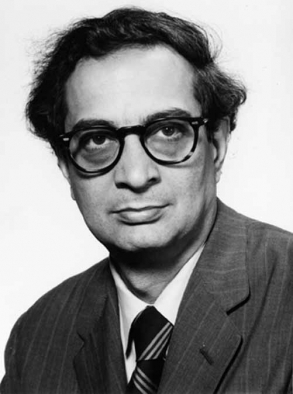
- Born: December 26, 1926; Tehran, Iran
- Died: September 12, 2016 (aged 89); Los Angeles, California, U.S.
- Education: Columbia University; University of Tehran
- Known for: Gas lasers Lasing without inversion Laser spectroscopy Timing frequency of light
- Awards: Stuart Ballantine Medal (1962); Albert Einstein World Award of Science (1993)
- Scientific career
- Fields: Physicist
- Workplaces: Columbia; Bell Labs; MIT
- Doctoral advisor: Charles Townes
- Doctoral students: Michael S. Feld; Richard M. Osgood Jr. Irving P. Herman
- Other notable students: Timothy Creamer; Joseph J. Romm

Ali Javan (Persian: علی جوان, romanized: Ali Javān; December 26, 1926 – September 12, 2016) was an Iranian American physicist and inventor. He was the first to propose the concept of the gas laser in 1959 at the Bell Telephone Laboratories. A successful prototype, constructed by him in collaboration with W. R. Bennett, Jr., and D. R. Herriott, was demonstrated in 1960. His other contributions to science have been in the fields of quantum physics and spectroscopy.

== Life and career ==
Ali Javan was born in Tehran to Iranian Azerbaijani parents from Tabriz. He attended a school conducted by Zoroastrians. He graduated from Alborz High School, and started his university studies at the School of Science at the University of Tehran for a year. During a visit to New York in 1948, he attended several graduate courses at Columbia University. He received his Ph.D. in 1954 under his thesis advisor Charles Townes without having received a bachelor's or master's degree. In 1955, Javan held a position as a Post Doctoral in the Radiation Laboratory and worked with Townes on the atomic clock research, and used the microwave atom beam spectrometer to study the hyperfine structure of atoms like copper and thallium.

In 1957, he published a paper on the theory of a three-level maser, and his discovery of the stimulated Raman effect showed that a Stokes-shifted Raman transition can produce amplification without requiring a population inversion. The effect was the precursor of a class of effects known as Lasers Without Inversion, or the LWI effect. He joined Bell Telephone Laboratories in 1958 shortly after he conceived the working principle of his gas discharge Helium Neon laser, and subsequently submitted his paper for publication which was reviewed by Samuel Goudsmit in 1960.

Javan's gas laser was the first continuously operating laser. It operated with a very low-energy input of about 25 watts or 50 watts in the first model, compared to thousands of watts required for the ruby lasers to produce short bursts. The output laser power was ~ 1 milliwatt. In addition, the ruby laser is greatly surpassed in the narrowness of its output of wavelengths by the gas laser. Its beam of infrared light was slightly less than half an inch wide and spread no more than a foot over a distance of a mile. Just one day after its realization, the laser was used to transmit a telephone call. Javan later described the moment: "I put in a call to the lab. One of the team members answered and asked me to hold the line for a moment. Then I heard a voice [Mr. Balik], somewhat quivering in transmission, telling me that it was the laser light speaking to me."

In 1966, Ali Javan and Theodore Maiman split a cash award presented to them by President Johnson honoring their work. In 1971, he became the director of Symposium on Laser Physics, which was held on the campus of University of Isfahan.

Javan carried out the first demonstration of optical heterodyne beats with lasers in 1961. Another major experiment was his observation of the detuning dip called the Lamb dip while scanning the frequency of a single-mode laser across the Doppler-broadened gain profile. Ali Javan and his colleagues pioneered in stabilizing laser frequencies with techniques utilizing the Lamb dip. In 1964, Javan and Townes devised experiments using lasers to test special relativity including a variant of the Michelson-Morley ether drift experiment to study the anisotropy of space. Javan's group repeated the Michelson-Morley experiment with a new order of accuracy by turning their lasers in different directions regarding the earth's motion. Any change in the velocity of light would show up as a change in the frequency of the output beam. The apparatus used was sensitive enough to detect a change as small as 0.03 millimeter per second (compared to the accuracy of 150 millimeters per second attained by Albert A. Michelson).

At MIT in the early 1960s, Ali Javan started a research project aimed at extending microwave frequency-measuring techniques into the infrared. He introduced the concept of an optical antenna of several wavelengths long which enables the near-complete confinement of an incident optical field coupled to it, and forming the antenna in nanoscale. For the first time an antenna was used to receive light and to transmit it to an infinitesimal receiving structure at its tip, observable only with an electron microscope. The antenna responded to infrared laser light and generated current vibrating at the frequencies of the incident beams. According to John L. Hall, during the 1962 American Physical Society meeting, Javan played a recording of the actual audio beat frequency between two of his lasers when they were tuned almost to the same optical frequency. Using this method Javan developed the first absolutely accurate measurement of the speed of light.

Javan first worked at Massachusetts Institute of Technology as an associate professor of physics in 1961 and has remained Francis Wright Davis Professor Emeritus of physics since 1964. He continued researching into the area of "optical electronics", which envisions scaling electronic elements in such a way that they would be capable of handling frequencies as high as visible optical radiation frequencies.

Javan died on September 12, 2016. He is survived by his wife, Marjorie, and by their two daughters, Lila and Maia.

== Honors ==
- Member of Sigma Xi
- National Academy of Sciences Fellow
- American Academy of Arts and Sciences Fellow
- 1962 - Stuart Ballantine Medal of the Franklin Institute for "conception and development of the first continuous optical laser which utilised Neon and Helium"
- 1966 - Fanny and John Hertz Foundation Medal
- 1966 - Guggenheim Foundation Fellowship
- 1975 - Frederic Ives Medal of the Optical Society of America
- 1979 - Humboldt Foundation Fellowship
- 1993 - Albert Einstein World Award of Science of the World Cultural Council
- 2006 - Inducted into the National Inventors Hall of Fame
- 2011 - SPIE Fellow
- 2012 - First member of Eurasian Academy

In 2007, Javan was ranked Number 12 on The Daily Telegraph's list of the "Top 100 Living Geniuses".

== See also ==
- MIT Physics Department
- List of Iranian scholars
- Higher Education in Iran
- List of lasers
- List of laser articles
