= Donald R. Herriott =

American physicist

- Born: February 4, 1928; Rochester, New York
- Died: November 8, 2007 (aged 79); Wrentham, Massachusetts
- Education: Duke University (Bachelor's in Physics); Institute of Optics of the University of Rochester; Polytechnic Institute of Brooklyn (Electrical Engineering)
- Known for: EBES electron lithographic system; The Herriott cell; Wavefront measuring techniques; Helium-Neon laser
- Awards: IEEE Cledo Brunetti Award (1981); OSA Joseph Fraunhofer Award (1984); Thomas Alva Edison Patent Award (1986)
- Scientific career
- Fields: Physics

Donald R. Herriott (February 4, 1928 – November 8, 2007) was an American physicist who is known for his contributions to interferometry, and for his efforts towards perfecting the techniques of high-resolution lithography. Herriott also helped bring the first helium-neon laser into operation. He was the president of the Optical Society of America in 1984.

== Life and career ==
Herriott was born in Rochester, New York to William and Lois (née Denton) Herriott.

During 1945–49, Herriott completed his undergraduate studies in physics at Duke University, and later studied optics at the University of Rochester, followed by electrical engineering at the Polytechnic Institute of Brooklyn (now part of New York University). From 1949 to 1956 he worked at the Bausch & Lomb Optical Company, while still attending the University of Rochester. His research involved thin films, interferometry, and measurement of the modulation transfer function of lenses.

In 1956, Herriott joined Bell Telephone Laboratories as an optical consultant in the research department. Here, he was involved in development of the flying-spot store, used in the first electronic switching system. He later collaborated with Ali Javan and his colleagues in the development of the first gas laser. Javan had enlisted Herriott specifically to design a resonator for his helium-neon laser. On 12 December 1960, Herriott was adjusting the mirrors of the Fabry-Perot structure he had designed, when the group obtained the first spike indicating lasing on the oscilloscope. In 1965 he proposed the concept of the Herriott cell. In 1968, while at Bell Labs, he became head of the lithographic systems development department. In this post, he worked on electron beam, optical and X-ray lithography systems for integrated circuit fabrication.

Herriott retired from Bell Labs in 1981, and began to consult as the senior scientific adviser at the Perkin Elmer Corporation. He served on the Board of Directors of The Optical Society of America from 1968-1970, and was subsequently elected as its 1982 vice-president and 1984 president.

Herriott died on 8 November 2007 following a long illness. He had three daughters and a son with his wife Karis Smith Herriott.

== See also ==
- Optical Society of America#Past Presidents of the OSA
