= Population inversion =

When a system has more excited-state members than ground-state

In physics, specifically statistical mechanics, a population inversion occurs when a system (such as a group of atoms or molecules) exists in a state in which more members of the system are in higher, excited states than in lower, unexcited energy states. It is called an "inversion" because in many familiar and commonly encountered physical systems in thermal equilibrium, this is not possible. This concept is of fundamental importance in laser science because the production of a population inversion is a necessary step in the workings of a standard laser.

== Condition ==
To understand the concept of a population inversion, it is necessary to understand some thermodynamics and the way that light interacts with matter. To do so, it is useful to consider a very simple assembly of atoms forming a laser medium.

Assume there is a group of N atoms, each of which is capable of being in one of two energy states: either

1. The ground state, with energy E_{1}; or
2. The excited state, with energy E_{2}, with E_{2} > E_{1}.

The number of these atoms which are in the ground state is given by N_{1}, and the number in the excited state N_{2}. Since there are N atoms in total,
$$N_1+N_2 = N$$
The energy difference between the two states, given by
$$\Delta E_{12} = E_2-E_1,$$
determines the characteristic frequency ν_{12} of light which will interact with the atoms; This is given by the relation
$$E_2-E_1 = \Delta E_{12} = h\nu_{12},$$
h being the Planck constant.

If the group of atoms is in thermal equilibrium, it can be shown from Maxwell–Boltzmann statistics that the ratio of the number of atoms in each state is given by the ratio of two Boltzmann distributions, the Boltzmann factor:
$$\frac{N_2}{N_1} = \frac{g_2}{g_1}\exp{\frac{-(E_2-E_1)}{kT}},$$
where T is the thermodynamic temperature of the group of atoms, k is the Boltzmann constant and g_{1} and g_{2} are the degeneracies of each state.

Calculable is the ratio of the populations of the two states at room temperature (T ≈ 300 K) for an energy difference ΔE that corresponds to light of a frequency corresponding to visible light (ν ≈ 5×10^{14} Hz). In this case ΔE = E_{2} − E_{1} ≈ 2.07 eV, and kT ≈ 0.026 eV. Since E_{2} − E_{1} ≫ kT, it follows that the argument of the exponential in the equation above is a large negative number, and as such N_{2}/N_{1} is vanishingly small; i.e., there are almost no atoms in the excited state. When in thermal equilibrium, then, it is seen that the lower energy state is more populated than the higher energy state, and this is the normal state of the system. As T increases, the number of electrons in the high-energy state (N_{2}) increases, but N_{2} never exceeds N_{1} for a system at thermal equilibrium; rather, at infinite temperature, the populations N_{2} and N_{1} become equal. In other words, a population inversion (N_{2}/N_{1} > 1) can never exist for a system at thermal equilibrium. To achieve population inversion therefore requires pushing the system into a non-equilibrated state.

== Interaction of light with matter ==
There are three types of possible interactions between a system of atoms and light that are of interest:

=== Absorption ===
If light (photons) of frequency ν_{12} passes through the group of atoms, there is a possibility of the light being absorbed by electrons which are in the ground state, which will cause them to be excited to the higher energy state. The rate of absorption is proportional to the radiation density of the light, and also to the number of atoms currently in the ground state, N_{1}.

=== Spontaneous emission ===
If atoms are in the excited state, spontaneous decay events to the ground state will occur at a rate proportional to N_{2}, the number of atoms in the excited state. The energy difference between the two states ΔE_{21} is emitted from the atom as a photon of frequency ν_{21} as given by the frequency-energy relation above.

The photons are emitted stochastically, and there is no fixed phase relationship between photons emitted from a group of excited atoms; in other words, spontaneous emission is incoherent. In the absence of other processes, the number of atoms in the excited state at time t, is given by
$$N_2(t) = N_2(0) \exp{\frac{-t}{\tau_{21}}},$$
where N_{2}(0) is the number of excited atoms at time t = 0, and τ_{21} is the mean lifetime of the transition between the two states.

=== Stimulated emission ===
If an atom is already in the excited state, it may be agitated by the passage of a photon that has a frequency ν_{21} corresponding to the energy gap ΔE of the excited state to ground state transition. In this case, the excited atom relaxes to the ground state, and it produces a second photon of frequency ν_{21}. The original photon is not absorbed by the atom, and so the result is two photons of the same frequency. This process is known as stimulated emission.

Specifically, an excited atom will act like a small electric dipole which will oscillate with the external field provided. One of the consequences of this oscillation is that it encourages electrons to decay to the lowest energy state. When this happens due to the presence of the electromagnetic field from a photon, a photon is released in the same phase and direction as the "stimulating" photon, and is called stimulated emission.

The rate at which stimulated emission occurs is proportional to the number of atoms N_{2} in the excited state, and the radiation density of the light. The base probability of a photon causing stimulated emission in a single excited atom was shown by Albert Einstein to be exactly equal to the probability of a photon being absorbed by an atom in the ground state. Therefore, when the numbers of atoms in the ground and excited states are equal, the rate of stimulated emission is equal to the rate of absorption for a given radiation density.

The critical detail of stimulated emission is that the induced photon has the same frequency and phase as the incident photon. In other words, the two photons are coherent. It is this property that allows optical amplification, and the production of a laser system. During the operation of a laser, all three light–matter interactions described above are taking place. Initially, atoms are energized from the ground state to the excited state by a process called pumping, described below. Some of these atoms decay via spontaneous emission, releasing incoherent light as photons of frequency, ν. These photons are fed back into the laser medium, usually by an optical resonator. Some of these photons are absorbed by the atoms in the ground state, and the photons are lost to the laser process. However, some photons cause stimulated emission in excited-state atoms, releasing another coherent photon. In effect, this results in optical amplification.

If the number of photons being amplified per unit time is greater than the number of photons being absorbed, then the net result is a continuously increasing number of photons being produced; the laser medium is said to have a gain of greater than unity.

Recall from the descriptions of absorption and stimulated emission above that the rates of these two processes are proportional to the number of atoms in the ground and excited states, N_{1} and N_{2}, respectively. If the ground state has a higher population than the excited state (N_{1} > N_{2}), then the absorption process dominates, and there is a net attenuation of photons. If the populations of the two states are the same (N_{1} = N_{2}), the rate of absorption of light exactly balances the rate of emission; the medium is then said to be optically transparent.

If the higher energy state has a greater population than the lower energy state (N_{1} < N_{2}), then the emission process dominates, and light in the system undergoes a net increase in intensity. It is thus clear that to produce a faster rate of stimulated emissions than absorptions, it is required that the ratio of the populations of the two states is such that N_{2}/N_{1} > 1; In other words, a population inversion is required for laser operation.

== Selection rules ==
Many transitions involving electromagnetic radiation are strictly forbidden under quantum mechanics. The allowed transitions are described by so-called selection rules, which describe the conditions under which a radiative transition is allowed. For instance, transitions are only allowed if ΔS = 0, S being the total spin angular momentum of the system. In real materials, other effects, such as interactions with the crystal lattice, intervene to circumvent the formal rules by providing alternate mechanisms. In these systems, the forbidden transitions can occur, but usually at slower rates than allowed transitions. A classic example is phosphorescence where a material has a ground state with S = 0, an excited state with S = 0, and an intermediate state with S = 1. The transition from the intermediate state to the ground state by emission of light is slow because of the selection rules. Thus emission may continue after the external illumination is removed. In contrast fluorescence in materials is characterized by emission which ceases when the external illumination is removed.

Transitions that do not involve the absorption or emission of radiation are not affected by selection rules. The radiationless transition between levels, such as between the excited S = 0 and S = 1 states, may proceed quickly enough to siphon off a portion of the S = 0 population before it spontaneously returns to the ground state.

The existence of intermediate states in materials is essential to the technique of optical pumping of lasers (see below).

== Creation ==
A population inversion is required for laser operation, but cannot be achieved in the above theoretical group of atoms with two energy-levels when they are in thermal equilibrium. In fact, any method by which the atoms are directly and continuously excited from the ground state to the excited state (such as optical absorption) will eventually reach equilibrium with the de-exciting processes of spontaneous and stimulated emission. At best, an equal population of the two states, N_{1} = N_{2} = N/2, can be achieved, resulting in optical transparency but no net optical gain. To achieve lasting non-equilibrium conditions, an indirect method of populating the excited state must be used.

=== In laser ===
==== In three-level laser ====
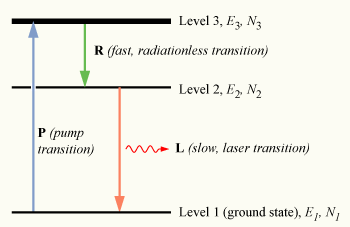
A three-level laser energy diagram.

A three-level laser may achieve population inversion. It consists of a group of N atoms, with each atom able to exist in any of three energy states, levels 1, 2 and 3, with energies E_{1}, E_{2}, and E_{3}, and populations N_{1}, N_{2}, and N_{3}, respectively. E_{1} < E_{2} < E_{3}; that is, the energy of level 2 lies between that of level 1 and level 3. The level 1 is also referred to as the ground state.

Initially, the system of atoms is at thermal equilibrium, and the majority of the atoms will be in the ground state, i.e., N_{1} ≈ N, N_{2} ≈ N_{3} ≈ 0. The atoms can be excited from level 1 to level 3 and this act is called pumping. It can happen when the atoms are subjected to light of a frequency
$$\nu_{13} \,=\, \frac{1}{h}\left(E_3 - E_1\right),$$
the process of optical absorption will excite electrons from level 1 to level 3. There are also methods not directly involving light absorption; such as electrical discharge or chemical reactions. The level 3 is sometimes referred to as the pump level or pump band, and the energy transition E_{1} → E_{3} as the pump transition (labeled transition P in the diagram on the right).

Upon pumping the medium, an appreciable number of atoms will transition to level 3, such that N_{3} > 0. To have a medium suitable for laser operation, it is necessary that these excited atoms quickly decay to level 2. The energy released in this transition may be emitted as a photon (spontaneous emission). However, in practice, the 3 → 2 transition is usually non-radiative (labeled transition R in the diagram), with the energy being released as phonons and transferred to vibrational motion (heat) of the host material surrounding the atoms, without the generation of a photon. This phenomenon is sometimes called collisional deactivation.

An electron in level 2 may decay by spontaneous emission to level 1, releasing a photon of frequency ν_{12} (given by E_{2} − E_{1} = hν_{12}), which is called the laser transitions (labelled transition L in the diagram). If the lifetime of this transition, τ_{21} is much longer than the lifetime of the non-radiative 3 → 2 transition τ_{32} (if τ_{21} ≫ τ_{32}, known as a favourable lifetime ratio), the population of the E_{3} will be essentially zero (N_{3} ≈ 0) and a population of excited state atoms will accumulate in level 2 (N_{2} > 0). If over half the N atoms can be accumulated in this state, this will exceed the population of the ground state N_{1}. A population inversion (N_{2} > N_{1}) has thus been achieved between level 1 and 2, and optical amplification at the frequency ν_{21} can be obtained.

Because at least half the population of atoms must be excited from the ground state to obtain a population inversion, the laser medium must be very strongly pumped. This makes three-level lasers rather inefficient, despite being the first type of laser to be discovered (based on a ruby laser medium, by Theodore Maiman in 1960). A three-level system could also have a radiative transition between level 3 and 2, and a non-radiative transition between 2 and 1. In this case, the pumping requirements are weaker. In practice, most lasers are four-level lasers, described below.

==== In four-level laser ====
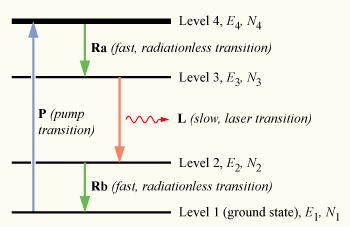
A four-level laser energy diagram.

In a four-level laser, there are four energy levels, levels 1, 2, 3, 4, with energies E_{1}, E_{2}, E_{3}, E_{4}, and populations N_{1}, N_{2}, N_{3}, N_{4}, respectively. The energies of each level are such that E_{1} < E_{2} < E_{3} < E_{4}.

In this system, the pumping transition P excites the atoms from level 1 to level 4 (the pump level). From level 4, the atoms decay by a fast, non-radiative transition Ra into the level 3. Since the lifetime of the laser transition L is long compared to that of Ra (τ_{32} ≫ τ_{43}), a population accumulates in level 3 (the upper laser level), which may relax by spontaneous or stimulated emission into level 2 (the lower laser level). This level likewise has a fast, non-radiative decay Rb into level 1.

As in three-level laser, the presence of a fast, non-radiative decay transition results in the population of the pump band being quickly depleted (N_{4} ≈ 0). In a four-level system, any atom in level 2 (the lower laser level) is also quickly de-excited, leading to a negligible population in that state (N_{2} ≈ 0). This is important, since any appreciable population accumulating in level 3 (the upper laser level) will form a population inversion with respect to level 2. That is, as long as N_{3} > 0, then N_{3} > N_{2}, and a population inversion is achieved. Thus optical amplification, and laser operation, can take place at a frequency of ν_{32} (E_{3} − E_{2} = hν_{32}).

Since only a few atoms must be excited into the upper laser level to form a population inversion (N_{2} ≈ 0 and N_{3} > 0, then N_{3} > N_{2} which means inversion), a four-level laser is much more efficient than a three-level one, and most practical lasers are of this type. In reality, many more than four energy levels may be involved in the laser process, with complex excitation and relaxation processes involved between these levels. In particular, the pump band may consist of several distinct energy levels, or a continuum of levels, which allow optical pumping of the medium over a wide range of wavelengths.

==== Properties ====
Note that in both three- and four-level lasers, the energy of the pumping transition is greater than that of the laser transition. This means that, if the laser is optically pumped, the frequency of the pumping light must be greater than that of the resulting laser light. In other words, the pump wavelength is shorter than the laser wavelength. It is possible in some media to use multiple photon absorptions between multiple lower-energy transitions to reach the pump level; such lasers are called up-conversion lasers.

While in many lasers the laser process involves the transition of atoms between different electronic energy states, as described in the model above, this is not the only mechanism that can result in laser action. For example, there are many common lasers (e.g., dye lasers, carbon dioxide lasers) where the laser medium consists of complete molecules, and energy states correspond to vibrational and rotational modes of oscillation of the molecules. This is the case with water masers, that occur in nature.

In some media it is possible, by imposing an additional optical or microwave field, to use quantum coherence effects to reduce the likelihood of a ground-state to excited-state transition. This technique, known as lasing without inversion, allows optical amplification to take place without producing a population inversion between the two states.

=== In maser ===
Stimulated emission was first observed in the microwave region of the electromagnetic spectrum, giving rise to the acronym MASER for Microwave Amplification by Stimulated Emission of Radiation. In the microwave region, the Boltzmann distribution of molecules among energy states is such that, at room temperature, all states are populated almost equally.

To create a population inversion under these conditions, it is necessary to selectively remove some atoms or molecules from the system based on differences in properties. For instance, in a hydrogen maser, the well-known 21cm wave transition in atomic hydrogen, where the lone electron flips its spin state from parallel to the nuclear spin to antiparallel, can be used to create a population inversion because the parallel state has a magnetic moment and the antiparallel state does not. A strong inhomogeneous magnetic field will separate atoms in the higher energy state from a beam of mixed-state atoms. The separated population represents a population inversion that can exhibit stimulated emissions.

== See also ==
- Laser construction
- Negative temperature
- Quantum electronics
