= Charles Hard Townes Award =

Optica prize for quantum electronics

The Charles Hard Townes Award of Optica is a prize for quantum electronics, including laser physics. It was created in 1980, in honor of Nobel Prize-winning laser pioneer Charles H. Townes. The Optical Society of America (now Optica), with help from Bell Laboratories, raised money for the award with an endowment campaign.

The prize has been awarded annually since 1981.

Former winners include Nobel Prize laureates John L. Hall, Claude Cohen-Tannoudji, Serge Haroche, Arthur Ashkin, and Gérard Mourou.

== Recipients ==
Year	Recipient	Citation
2026	Yoshihisa Yamamoto	"For his influential work on networks of degenerate optical parametric oscillators, coherent Ising machines, and their applications."
2025	Kerry John Vahala	"For pioneering contributions to the development and application of optical microresonators and nonlinear optical oscillators."
2024	Franco Nori	"For his many fundamental contributions to quantum optics, quantum information processing and quantum circuits, and for the development of key quantum software tools."
2023	Andrew M. Weiner	"For ground-breaking work bringing optical frequency combs to the quantum world and developing innovative applications spanning several fields, including coherent control, generation and line-by-line manipulation of frequency combs, and ultrabroadband radio-frequency photonics."
2022	Girish Saran Agarwal	"For discoveries in theoretical quantum optics especially vacuum-induced coherences, photon-added coherent states, nonclassical cat states for qubits via engineered many-body interactions, and transparency in optomechanical systems."
2021	Mikhail Lukin	"For his pioneering theoretical and experimental contributions to quantum nonlinear optics and quantum information science and technology, and for the development and application of nanoscale quantum systems for sensing."
2020	Toshiki Tajima	"For seminal contributions in broad and novel plasma physics and laser-based accelerator physics, introducing the concept of Laser Wakefield Acceleration."
2019	Alexander L. Gaeta	"For seminal contributions to chip-based nonlinear photonics, nonlinear optics in photonic crystal fibers, and nonlinear propagation of ultrashort laser pulses."
2018	Peter Fritschel	"For advances in quantum-limited precision measurement in the Advanced LIGO detectors, leading to the first direct detection of gravitational waves."
2017	Adolf Giesen	"For pioneering breakthroughs in the field of solid-state lasers by the invention of and fundamental contributions to thin disk lasers."
2016	Robert W. Boyd	"For fundamental contributions to the field of nonlinear optics, including the development of methods for controlling the velocity of light, of quantum imaging methods, and of composite nonlinear optical materials."
2015	Ursula Keller	"For seminal contributions in the fields of octave-spanning lasers, frequency comb technology, and high repetition-rate ultrafast semiconductor disc lasers."
2014	Masataka Nakazawa	"For seminal contributions to the science and applications of ultrafast optics and ultrastable narrow-linewidth lasers."
2013	Günter Huber	"For seminal contributions to solid state lasers, in particular the growth, development, and fundamental characterization of new laser materials based on laser active transition metal and rare earth ions."
2012	Philippe Grangier	"For breakthroughs in fundamental quantum optics, based on invention and/or development of experimental methods and techniques, and leading to groundbreaking applications in quantum information."
2011	Wilson Sibbett	"For pioneering breakthroughs in the science and technology of ultrashort optical pulses including generation, measurement and the development of practical sources for applications in photophysics, photochemistry, photomedicine, engineering and communications."
2010	Atac Imamoglu	"For his seminal contribution to electromagnetically induced transparency and pioneering work on quantum information processing with quantum dots."
2009	Gérard Mourou	"For ground-breaking applications of high-intensity lasers to precision micromachining, eye surgery and relativistic light-matter interactions."
2008	Robert R. Alfano	"For contributions to the discovery and investigation of supercontinuum generation and the development of tetravalent chromium-based tunable solid state lasers."
2007	Serge Haroche	"For pioneering experiments in cavity quantum electrodynamics, starting with the observation of superradiance, leading to the twophoton maser, non-destructive measurements of photons, and decoherence of Schrödinger cats."
2006	Orazio Svelto	"For pioneering work on ultrashort laser pulses and solid state lasers, and for the invention of the hollow-fiber compressor, leading to advances in extreme nonlinear optics and attosecond science."
2005	Paul Corkum	"For key contributions to the understanding of the physics of atoms and molecules in intense laser fields and the application of these ideas to ultra-fast measurement techniques."
2004	Erich P. Ippen	"For his many outstanding, pioneering and sustained contributions to ultrafast science and technology, and fundamental nonlinear optics."
2003	David C. Hanna	"For seminal contributions to the development of coherent light sources and for leadership within the worldwide optics community."
2002	Charles V. Shank	"For the development of ultra short lasers from the near-infrared to x-rays, and their application to condensed-matter problems in chemistry, physics, and biology."
2001	A. David Buckingham	"For many theoretical and experimental contributions to electro-optics and magneto-optics, including the invention and application of a direct method for measuring molecular electric quadruple moments."
2000	Richard G. Brewer	"For his outstanding contributions to quantum optics, characterized by originality and diversity, involving the interplay of theory and elegant experiments to elucidate fundamental problems of coherent optical transients, using atoms, molecules, solids and trapped ions."
1999	Charles H. Henry	"For fundamental contributions to the understanding of the optical properties of quantum wells, semiconductor lasers, and advanced photonic technologies."
1998	Marlan O. Scully	"For his role in laying the theoretical foundation for laser science, free-electron lasers, and lasers without inversion."
1997	Linn F. Mollenauer	"For pioneering ultrafast optics in the 1.5 μm wavelength regime, demonstrating optical soliton propagation in fibers, and developing innovative soliton systems that have set records for high-capacity repeaterless data transmission."
1996	Chung Liang Tang	"For seminal and pioneering advances in the field of nonlinear optics and laser physics."
1995	Ivan P. Kaminow	"For outstanding leadership and contributions to the field of quantum electronics over the past 40 years, which include pioneering the invention and development of titanium-diffused LiNb03 waveguides and revolutionary innovations in electro-optic modulators."
1994	Joseph H. Eberly	"For his contributions to theoretical optical physics, in particular, his work on coherent pulse propagation and superradiance, atomic radiation theory, cavity quantum electrodynamics, and multiphoton intense field phenomena."
1993	Claude Cohen-Tannoudji	"For his contributions to optical pumping and his development of the dressed atom method for describing electromagnetic interactions with matter."
1992	Nick Holonyak	"For his career in quantum electronics, particularly his contributions to semiconducting, light-emitting sources."
1991	Elias Snitzer	"For his pioneering contributions to solid state lasers and fiber optics, in particular, neodymium-glass and erbium-glass lasers, the first fiber optic laser, and for innovative contributions to fiber optic amplifiers and fiber optic lasers."
1990	Herbert Walther	"For his fundamental contributions to the quantum electronics of atoms and molecules."
1989	Daniel Joseph Bradley	"For his pioneering contributions to the fields of nonlinear optics, the physics of dye lasers, and the generation and detection of ultrashort light pulses."
1988	Arthur Ashkin	"For original, creative, experimental, and theoretical work that initiated the study of laser radiation pressure and for continuing exceptional contributions."
1987	Hermann A. Haus	"For his analysis of laser noise, the development of the mode-locked semiconductor laser, and contributions to our understanding of nonlinear waveguide interactions."
1986	Yuen-Ron Shen	"For his pioneering and continuing contributions to the field of nonlinear optics."
1985	Stephen E. Harris	"For his contributions to the development of techniques for the generation of extreme ultraviolet and soft x-ray radiation."
1984	Veniamin P. Chebotaev	"In recognition of independent pioneering efforts and continuing contributions in the field of laser metrology, ultrahigh resolution spectroscopy, and ultrastable laser sources."
1984	John L. Hall	"In recognition of independent pioneering efforts and continuing contributions in the field of laser metrology, ultrahigh resolution spectroscopy, and ultrastable laser sources."
1983	Robert W. Hellwarth	"For his invention of the Q-switched laser, codiscovery of the Raman laser and explanation of stimulated scattering phenomena, and the theory of optical phase conjugation."
1982	Chandra Kumar N. Patel	"For his pioneering contributions to quantum electronics, including the discovery of many gaseous laser systems, particularly to the CO_{2} laser; his invention and development of the spin-flip Raman laser; his high-resolution studies for pollution detection in the atmosphere; and his contributions to acousto-optic techniques for measuring small optical absorptions."
1981	James P. Gordon	"For their contributions to the successful operation of the first quantum-electronics device, the ammonia maser."
1981	Herbert Zeiger	"For their contributions to the successful operation of the first quantum-electronics device, the ammonia maser."

== See also ==
- List of physics awards
