= James P. Gordon =

American physicist

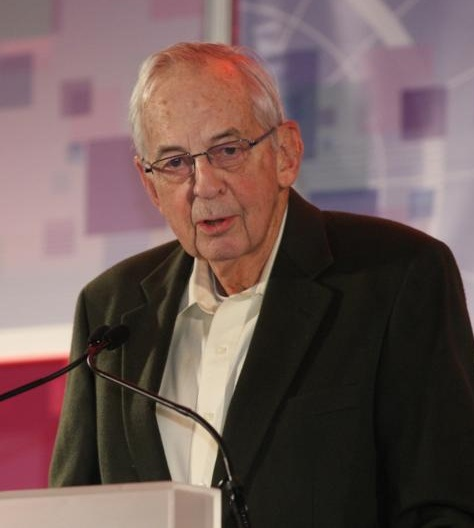
- Born: March 20, 1928; New York City, New York, U.S.
- Died: June 21, 2013 (aged 85); Manhattan, New York City, U.S.
- Education: Columbia University; Massachusetts Institute of Technology
- Scientific career
- Fields: Physics
- Workplaces: Bell Labs
- Doctoral advisor: Charles Hard Townes

James Power Gordon (March 20, 1928 – June 21, 2013) was an American physicist known for his work in the fields of optics and quantum electronics. His contributions include the design, analysis and construction of the first maser in 1954 as a doctoral student at Columbia University under the supervision of C. H. Townes, development of the quantal equivalent of Shannon's information capacity formula in 1962, development of the theory for the diffusion of atoms in an optical trap (together with A. Ashkin) in 1980, and the discovery of what is now known as the Gordon-Haus effect in soliton transmission, together with H. A. Haus in 1986. Gordon was a member of the National Academy of Engineering (since 1985) and the National Academy of Sciences (since 1988).

== Biography and personal life ==
J. P. Gordon was born in Brooklyn, New York, on March 20, 1928, and was raised in Forest Hills, Queens and Scarsdale, New York. His father, Robert S. Gordon was a lawyer and worked as VP and General Counsel for National Dairy, now Kraftco. Gordon attended Scarsdale High School and Phillips Exeter Academy (Class of 1945). In 1949, he received a bachelor's degree from the Massachusetts Institute of Technology (MIT) and joined the physics department of Columbia University as a graduate student. He received his master's degree and PhD degrees in physics in 1951 and 1955, respectively. In the framework of his doctoral research he designed, built and demonstrated the successful operation of the first maser together with Herbert J. Zeiger and with his doctoral advisor Charles H. Townes. The invention of the maser won the Nobel Prize in Physics, which C.H. Townes shared in 1964 with the Russian scientists N. Bassov and A. Prokhorov. Starting in 1955 and until his retirement in 1996, Gordon worked as a scientist at AT&T Bell-Laboratories, where in the period between 1958 and 1980 he headed the Quantum Electronics Research Department, located initially in Murray Hill and later in Holmdel Township, both in the state of New Jersey. In 1962–1963, he spent one year as a visiting professor at the University of California, San Diego.

In 1960, he married Susanna Bland Waldner, a former Bell-Labs computer programmer. The couple had three children: James Jr., Susanna, and Sara. A resident of Rumson, New Jersey, he died aged 85 on June 21, 2013, at a hospital in New York City due to cancer.

In addition to his scientific career, Gordon played platform tennis, having won the U.S. National Championship for men's doubles in 1959, and mixed doubles in 1961 and 1962.

Gordon's brother, Robert S. Gordon Jr. (1926–1985) set up a Cholera Clinic in East Pakistan, where he made seminal contributions to the study of this disease. The Gordon Lecture in Epidemiology is a yearly award in his honor, granted by the National Institutes of Health (NIH).

== Scientific activity ==
=== Lasers and resonators ===
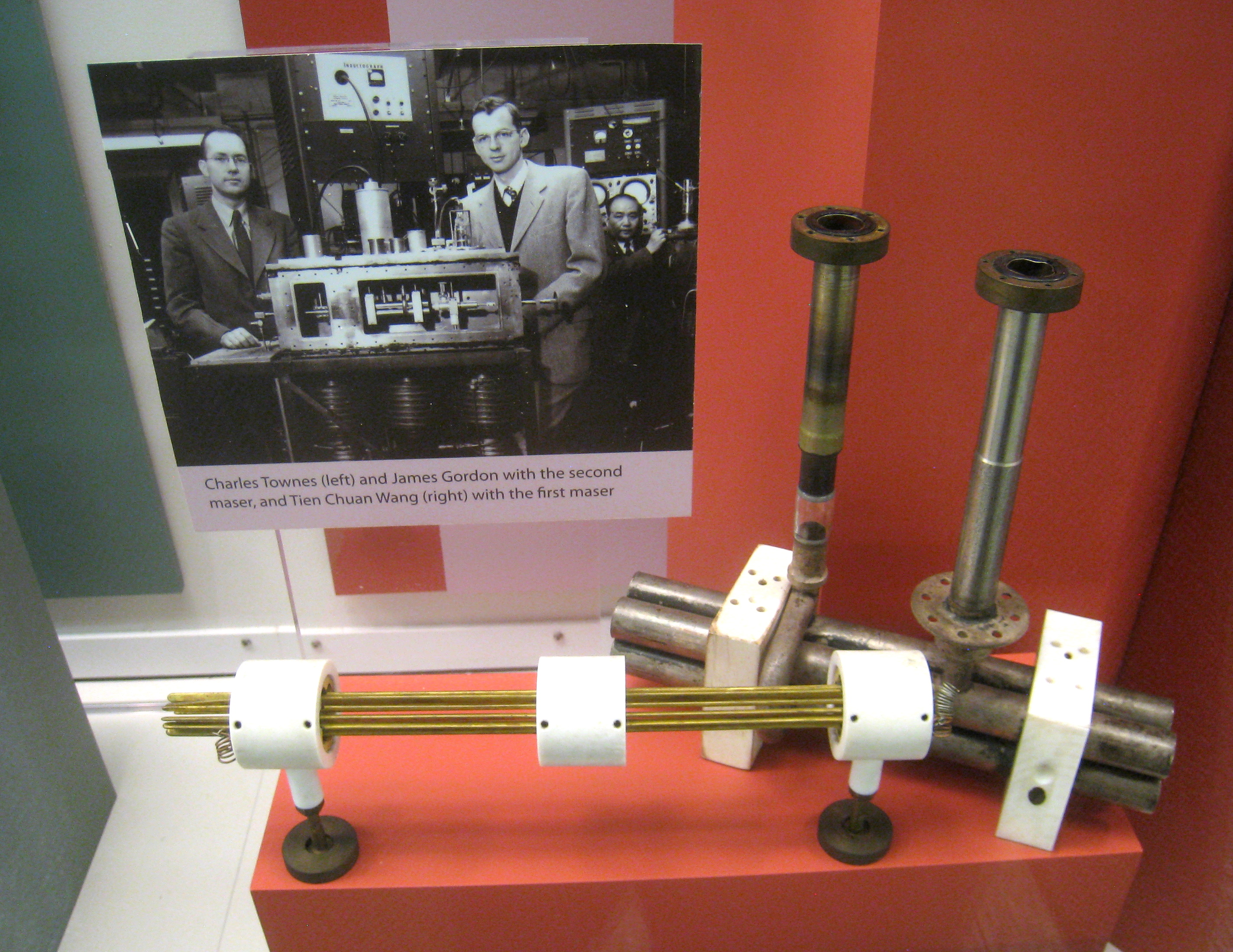
Picture of James P. Gordon with Charles H. Townes behind maser components, at the exhibit in National Museum of American History, Washington, DC, USA.

During his doctoral training period with C.H. Townes at Columbia University, Gordon worked on the design, analysis and construction of the maser. This work produced the first prototype of what later evolved into the laser (originally called "optical maser") and became one of the most important workhorses in 20th-century technology. Gordon's later contribution to lasers included the analysis of the confocal, or curved mirror laser resonator. He joined with G. Boyd, to introduce the concept of Hermite-Gaussian modes into resonator study, influencing all subsequent research conducted on laser resonators. In his work with R.L. Fork and O.E. Martinez in 1994, a mechanism for generating tunable negative dispersion using pairs of prisms was proposed. This invention was instrumental in achieving ultra-short laser pulses, critical in many applications using laser technology.

=== Quantum information ===
In 1962, Gordon studied the implications of quantum mechanics on Shannon's information capacity. He pointed out the main effects of quantization and conjectured the quantum equivalent of Shannon's formula for the information capacity of a channel. Gordon's conjecture, later proven by Alexander Holevo and known as Holevo's theorem, became one of the central results in the modern field of quantum information theory. In his work with W.H. Louisell published in 1966, Gordon addressed the problem of measurement in quantum physics, focusing in particular on the simultaneous measurement of noncommuting observables. The concept of "measurement operator," which was introduced in that work was an early version of what is currently referred to as positive-operator valued measure (POVM) in the context of quantum measurement theory. After his retirement, Gordon re-engaged with the topic of quantum information and his last paper on the subject, titled "Communication and Measurement", was published on arxiv one year after his death.

=== Atom diffusion ===
Having joined Arthur Ashkin's efforts of manipulating microparticles with laser beams, Gordon wrote the first theory describing radiation forces and momenta in dielectric media. Later, jointly with Ashkin, he modeled the motion of atoms in a radiation trap. This work together with Ashkin's experiments, was the basis for what later developed into the fields of atom trapping and optical tweezers. Ashkin's work on optical tweezers was recognized with the Nobel Prize in Physics awarded to him in 2018.

=== Solitons and optical communications ===
Much of Gordon's later career focused on the study of soliton transmission in optical fibers. He reported the first experimental observation of solitons in optical fibers in a paper co-authored with R.H. Stolen and L.F. Mollenauer. In a seminal 1986 paper, Gordon explained and formulated the theory of the soliton self-frequency shift that had been observed prior to that in experiments. In the same year, together with Prof. H. A. Haus of the Massachusetts Institute of Technology (MIT), he predicted and quantified the timing-jitter effect resulting from the coupling between solitons and optical amplification noise in amplified optical systems. This effect was shown to be one of the most fundamental factors in determining the performance of soliton systems and it is now broadly recognized as the Gordon-Haus effect. In 1990, Gordon and Mollenauer predicted and analyzed the enhancement of phase-noise as a result of the optical nonlinearity of fibers. This phenomenon, often referred to as the Gordon-Mollenauer effect, was a key factor in preventing the use of solitons in coherent optical communications.

Gordon's most recent major contribution to the field of fiber-optic communications was in the mathematical formulation of the phenomenon of polarization mode dispersion (PMD), which constitutes one of the most important factors in determining the performance of fiber-optic systems. His paper, coauthored with H. Kogelnik, appeared in the Proceedings of the National Academy of Sciences, and the formulation presented therein became standard in many of the subsequent texts dealing with polarization phenomena in optical fibers.

== Societies and honors ==
- Fellow of the American Physical Society
- Fellow of the Optical Society of America (OSA)
- Life fellow of IEEE
- Charles Hard Townes Award (OSA, 1981)
- National Academy of Engineering (member since 1985)
- National Academy of Sciences (member since 1988)
- Max Born Award (OSA, 1991)
- Willis E. Lamb Award for laser science and quantum optics (2001)
- Fredric Ives Medal/Jarus W. Quinn Prize (OSA, 2002)
- Honorary Member of the Optical Society (OSA, 2011)
