= Svelto =

Svelto is an Italian surname. Notable people with the surname include:

- Francesco Svelto (born 1966), Italian electrical engineer
- Orazio Svelto (1936–2026), Italian physicist, academic and author
