= FIAN =

FIAN can stand for:

- Food First Information and Action Network, an international organisation;
- FIAN, a common abbreviation for the Lebedev Physical Institute in Moscow.
- Fian, small warrior bands in Irish and Scottish mythology (pl Fianna )
- Irish name for little warrior
