= Robert W. Hellwarth =

American physicist and electrical engineer (1930–2021)

- Born: December 10, 1930; Ann Arbor, Michigan, U.S.
- Died: January 20, 2021 (aged 90); Santa Monica, California, U.S.
- Education: Princeton University; University of Oxford
- Known for: Q-switching; Optical phase conjugation Raman-induced Kerr effect Nonlinear optical processes
- Awards: Member, National Academy of Engineering (1977); Member, National Academy of Sciences; Charles Hard Townes Award (1983); IEEE Quantum Electronics Award (1985); Fellow, American Academy of Arts and Sciences (2006)
- Scientific career
- Fields: Physics; Electrical engineering Nonlinear optics Photonics
- Workplaces: Hughes Aircraft Company; Hughes Research Laboratories; California Institute of Technology; University of Southern California

Robert Willis Hellwarth (December 10, 1930 – January 20, 2021) was an American physicist and electrical engineer who studied quantum electronics, nonlinear optics, and photonics. He is known for the invention of Q-switching, a technique that produces short, intense pulses of laser light, and for work on optical phase conjugation and nonlinear optical processes.

== Early life and education ==
Hellwarth was born December 10, 1930, in Ann Arbor, Michigan, the son of Arlen Roosevelt Hellwarth, an electrical engineer, and Sarah Townsend Hellwarth. He grew up in Detroit and attended public schools, including Cooley High School; he was offered a scholarship to Princeton University. He graduated from Princeton University in 1952 as valedictorian with a dual B.S. in electrical engineering and physics. He next attended St John’s College, Oxford as a Rhodes Scholar, where he joined the Clarendon Laboratory and earned a Ph.D. in physics in 1955. His doctoral dissertation was titled An Investigation of Hyperfine Structure Using the Atomic Beam Magnetic Resonance Method.

== Career ==
After completing his graduate work at Oxford, Hellwarth took a position at Hughes Aircraft Company in Culver City; he subsequently worked at Hughes Research Laboratories in Malibu, and managed their Theoretical Studies Department, while holding appointments at Caltech.

Hellwarth coauthored a 1957 paper on the Schrödinger equation and maser amplifiers and oscillators. He later coauthored a 1962 paper on electron transport in polar crystals that helped develop the concept of a polaron.

He moved to the University of Southern California in 1971 as professor of electrical engineering and physics, where he became the George Pfleger Professor of Electrical Engineering and professor of physics and astronomy until his retirement in 2018.

== Research and inventions ==
Hellwarth worked in the fields of quantum electronics, nonlinear optics, and photonics.

Q-switching, which Hellwarth co-invented with F.J. McClung at Hughes Research Laboratories in 1961–62, increased laser pulse power by a factor of approximately one million. Applications of Q-switched lasers include tattoo removal, surgical procedures, metal cutting, and research into laser-induced nuclear fusion.

At USC, Hellwarth focused on nonlinear optical processes, devices, and materials, including work on four-wave mixing that led to the development of optical phase conjugation; this work was relevant to correction of astronomical images distorted by atmospheric fluctuations.

The description of his work that led to his election to the American Academy of Arts and Sciences mentions contributions to early laser developments at Hughes Research Laboratories and to photonics and astronomical instrumentation.

== Honors and awards ==
- Member of the National Academy of Engineering (1977)
- Member of the National Academy of Sciences (1986)
- Fellow of the American Physical Society (1982)
- Fellow of the Institute of Electrical and Electronics Engineers
- Fellow of the American Association for the Advancement of Science (1983)
- Fellow of the Optical Society of America (1987) and received their Charles Hard Townes Award in 1983
- Fellow of the American Academy of Arts and Sciences (2006)
- Received the IEEE Quantum Electronics Award in 1985
