= David C. Hanna =

British physicist

David C. Hanna FRS
- Born: 10 April 1941
- Died: 27 January 2026 (aged 84)
- Citizenship: Great Britain
- Awards: Max Born Prize (1993); EPS Applied Quantum Electronics Prize (2000); Charles Hard Townes Medal (2003)
- Scientific career
- Fields: laser physics, nonlinear optics
- Institutions: Southampton University

David Colin Hanna FRS (10 April 1941 − 27 January 2026) was a British physicist specializing in laser physics and nonlinear optics. He was emeritus professor of physics at the University of Southampton. His research interests include quasi-phase-matched nonlinear materials, optical parametric oscillators, fibre lasers, and X-ray sources based on high harmonic generation.

Hanna was awarded the Max Born Prize in 1993, the European Physical Society Prize for Applied Aspects of Quantum Electronics and Optics in 2000, and the Charles Hard Townes Medal in 2003. Hanna was elected to the Royal Society in 1998.

== Works ==
- Orazio Svelto (1998). Principles of lasers. Translator David C. Hanna. Springer. ISBN 978-0-306-45748-7.
