= Sound amplification by stimulated emission of radiation =

Device that emites acoustic radiation

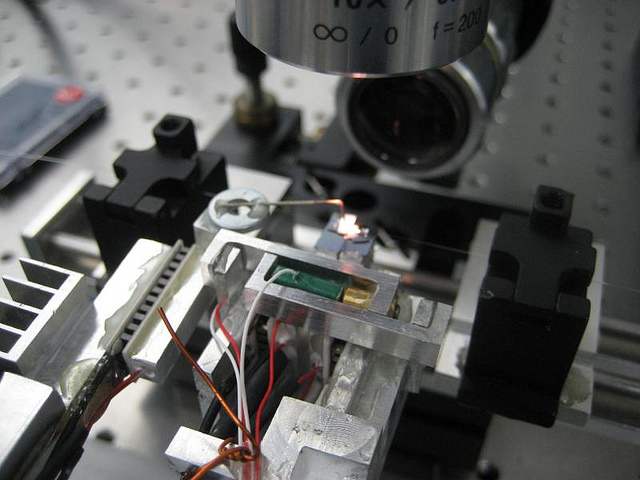
A phonon laser device

Sound amplification by stimulated emission of radiation (SASER) refers to a device that emits acoustic radiation. It focuses sound waves in a way that they can serve as accurate and high-speed carriers of information in many kinds of applications—similar to uses of laser light.

Acoustic radiation (sound waves) can be emitted by using the process of sound amplification based on stimulated emission of phonons. Sound (or lattice vibration) can be described by a phonon just as light can be considered as photons, and therefore one can state that SASER is the acoustic analogue of the laser.

In a SASER device, a source (e.g., an electric field as a pump) produces sound waves (lattice vibrations, phonons) that travel through an active medium. In this active medium, a stimulated emission of phonons leads to amplification of the sound waves, resulting in a sound beam coming out of the device. The sound wave beams emitted from such devices are highly coherent.

The first successful SASER was developed in 2009.

== Terminology ==
Instead of a feedback-built wave of electromagnetic radiation (i.e., a laser beam), a SASER delivers a sound wave. SASER may also be referred to as phonon laser, acoustic laser or sound laser.

== Uses and applications ==
SASERs could have wide applications. Apart from facilitating the investigation of terahertz-frequency ultrasound, the SASER is also likely to find uses in optoelectronics (electronic devices that detect and control light—as a method of transmitting a signal from an end to the other of, for instance, fiber optics), as a method of signal modulation and/or transmission.

Such devices could be high precision measurement instruments and they could lead to high energy focused sound.

Using SASERs to manipulate electrons inside semiconductors could theoretically result in terahertz-frequency computer processors, much faster than the current chips.

== History ==
This concept can be more conceivable by imagining it in analogy to laser theory. Theodore Maiman operated the first functioning LASER on May 16, 1960 at Hughes Research Laboratories, Malibu, California, A device that operates according to the central idea of the "sound amplification by stimulated emission of radiation" theory is the thermoacoustic laser. This is a half-open pipe with a heat differential across a special porous material inserted in the pipe. Much like a light laser, a thermoacoustic SASER has a high-Q cavity and uses a gain medium to amplify coherent waves. For further explanation see thermoacoustic heat engine.

The possibility of phonon laser action had been proposed in a wide range of physical systems such as nanomechanics, semiconductors, nanomagnets and paramagnetic ions in a lattice.

Finding materials that stimulate emission was needed for the development of the SASER. The generation of coherent phonons in a double-barrier semiconductor heterostructure was first proposed around 1990. The transformation of the electric potential energy in a vibrational mode of the lattice is remarkably facilitated by the electronic confinement in a double-barrier structure. On this basis, physicists were searching for materials in which stimulated emission rather than spontaneous emission, is the dominant decay process. A device was first experimentally demonstrated in the Gigahertz range in 2009.

Announced in 2010, two independent groups came up with two different devices that produce coherent phonons at any frequency in the range megahertz to terahertz. One group from the University of Nottingham consisted of A.J. Kent and his colleagues R.P. Beardsley, A.V. Akimov, W. Maryam and M. Henini. The other group from the California Institute of Technology (Caltech) consisted of I.S. Grudinin, H. Lee, O. Painter and K.J. Vahala from Caltech implemented a study on Phonon Laser Action in a tunable two-level system. The University of Nottingham device operates at about 440 GHz, while the Caltech device operates in the megahertz range. According to a member of the Nottingham group, the two approaches are complementary and it should be possible to use one device or the other to create coherent phonons at any frequency in the megahertz to terahertz range. A significant result rises from the operating frequency of these devices. The differences between the two devices suggest that SASERs could be made to operate over a wide range of frequencies.

Work on the SASER continues at the University of Nottingham, the Lashkarev Institute of Semiconductor Physics at the National Academy of Sciences of Ukraine, and Caltech.

In 2023 researchers using a Paul trap coaxed two ions into forming a phonon laser containing fewer than 10 phonons, placing it firmly in the quantum regime, whereas previous phonon lasers had had at least 10,000 phonons.

== Design ==
SASER's central idea is based on sound waves. The set-up needed for the implementation of sound amplification by stimulated emission of radiation is similar to an oscillator. An oscillator can produce oscillations without any external feed-mechanism. An example is a common sound amplification system with a microphone, amplifier and speaker. When the microphone is in front of the speaker, we hear an annoying whistle. This whistle is generated without extra contribution from the sound source, and is self-reinforced and self-sufficient while the microphone is somewhere in front of the speaker. This phenomenon, known as the Larsen effect, is the result of a positive feedback.

The analogy between a laser and a SASER device should be considered. Components of a typical laser: 1. Gain medium; 2. Laser pumping energy; 3. High reflector; 4. Output coupler; 5. Laser beam

In general, every oscillator consists of three main parts. These are the power source or pump, the amplifier and the positive feedback leading to the output. The corresponding parts in a SASER device are the excitation or pumping mechanism, the active (amplifying) medium, and the feedback leading to acoustic radiation. Pumping can be performed, for instance, with an alternating electric field or with some mechanical vibrations of resonators. The active medium should be a material in which sound amplification can be induced. An example of a feedback mechanism into the active medium is the existence of superlattice layers that reflect the phonons back and force them to bounce repeatedly to amplify sound.

Therefore, to proceed to an understanding of a SASER design we need to imagine it in analogy with a laser device. In a laser, the active medium is placed between two mirror surfaces (reflectors)of a Fabry–Pérot interferometer. A spontaneously emitted photon inside this interferometer can force excited atoms to decay a photon of same frequency, same momentum, same polarization and same phase. Because the momentum (as a vector) of the photon is nearly parallel to the axes of the mirrors, it is possible for photons to repeat multiple reflections and force more and more photons to follow them producing an avalanche effect. The number of photons of this coherent laser beam increases and competes the number of photons perished due to losses. The basic necessary condition for the generation of a laser radiation is the population inversion, which can be achieved either by exciting atoms and inducing percussion or by external radiation absorption. A SASER device mimics this procedure using a source-pump to induce a sound beam of phonons. This sound beam propagates not in an optical cavity, but in a different active medium. An example of an active medium is the superlattice. A superlattice can consist of multiple ultra-thin lattices of two different semiconductors. These two semiconductor materials have different band gaps, and form quantum wells—which are potential wells that confine particles to move in two dimensions instead of three, forcing them to occupy a planar region. In the superlattice, a new set of selection rules is composed that affects the flow-conditions of charges through the structure. When this set-up is excited by a source, the phonons start to multiply while they reflect on the lattice levels, until they escape from the lattice structure in a form of an ultrahigh frequency phonon beam.

The structure of a superlattice of semiconductor layers (AlAs, GaAs). Acoustic waves undergo amplification

Namely, a concerted emission of phonons can lead to coherent sound and an example of concerted phonon emission is the emission coming from quantum wells. This stands in similar paths with the laser where a coherent light can build up by the concerted stimulated emission of light from a lot of atoms. A SASER device transforms the electric potential energy in a single vibrational mode of the lattice (phonon).

The medium where the amplification takes place consists of stacks of thin layers of semiconductors that together form quantum wells. In these wells, electrons can be excited by parcels of ultrasound of millielectronvolts of energy. This amount of energy is equivalent to a frequency of 0.1 to 1 THz.

== Physics ==
Normal modes of vibration progression through a crystal in 1D. The amplitude of the motion has been exaggerated for ease of viewing; in an actual crystal, it is typically much smaller than the lattice spacing. The vibration energy of the lattice can take discrete values for every excitation. Every one of this "excitation packages" is called phonon.

Just as light is a wave motion that is considered as composed of particles called photons, we can think of the normal modes of vibration in a solid as being particle-like. The quantum of lattice vibration is called phonon. In lattice dynamics we want to find the normal modes of vibration of a crystal. In other words, we need to calculate the energies (or frequencies ) of the phonons as a function of their wave vector's k . The relationship between frequency ω and wave vector k is called phonon dispersion.

Light and sound are similar in various ways. They both can be thought of in terms of waves, and they both come in quantum mechanical units. In the case of light we have photons while in sound we have phonons. Both sound and light can be produced as random collections of quanta (e.g. light emitted by a light bulb) or orderly waves that travel in a coordinated form (e.g. laser light). This parallelism implies that lasers should be as feasible with sound as they are with light. In the 21st century, it is easy to produce low frequency sound in the range that humans can hear (~20 kHz), in either a random or orderly form. However, at the terahertz frequencies in the regime of phonon laser applications, more difficulties arise. The problem stems from the fact that sound travels much slower than light. This means that the wavelength of sound is much shorter than light at a given frequency. Instead of resulting in orderly, coherent phonons, laser structures that can produce terahertz sound tend to emit phonons randomly. Researchers have overcome the problem of terahertz frequencies by following various approaches. Scientists in Caltech have overcome this problem by assembling a pair of microscopic cavities that only permit specific frequencies of phonons to be emitted. This system can be also tuned to emit phonons of different frequencies by changing the relative separation of the microcavities. On the other hand, the group from the University of Nottingham took a different approach. They have built their device out of electrons moving through a series of structures known as quantum wells. Briefly, as an electron hops from one quantum well to another neighbouring well it produces a phonon.

External energy pumping (e.g. a light beam or voltage) can help to the excitation of an electron. Relaxation of an electron from one of the upper states may occur by emission of either a photon or a phonon. This is determined by the density of states of phonons and photons. Density of states is the number of states per volume unit in an interval of energy (E, E + dE) that are available to be occupied by electrons. Both phonons and photons are bosons and thus, they obey Bose–Einstein statistics. This means that, since bosons with the same energy can occupy the same place in space, phonons and photons are force carrier particles and they have integer spins. There are more allowed states available for occupancy in a phonon field than in a photon field. Therefore, since the density of terminal states in the phonon field exceeds that in a photon field (by up to ~10^{5}), phonon emission is by far the more likely event. We could also imagine a concept where the excitation of an electron briefly leads to vibration of the lattice and thus to phonon generation. The vibration energy of the lattice can take discrete values for every excitation. Every one of this "excitation packages" is called phonon. An electron does not stay in an excited state for too long. It readily releases energy to return to its stable low energy state. The electrons release energy in any random direction and at any time (after their excitation). At some particular times, some electrons get excited while others lose energy in a way that the average energy of system is the lowest possible.

GaAs/AlAs superlattice and potential profile of conduction and valence bands along the growth direction (z).

By pumping energy into the system we can achieve a population inversion. This means that there are more excited electrons than electrons in the lowest energy state in the system. As electron releases energy (e.g. phonon) it interacts with another excited electron to release its energy too. Therefore, we have a stimulated emission, which means a lot of energy (e.g., acoustic radiation, phonons) is released at the same time. One can mention that the stimulated emission is a procedure where we have a spontaneous and an induced emission at the same time. The induced emission comes from the pumping procedure and then is added to the spontaneous emission.

A SASER device should consist of a pumping mechanism and an active medium. The pumping procedure can be induced for example by an alternating electric field or with some mechanical vibrations of resonators, followed by acoustic amplification in the active medium. The fact that a SASER operates on principles remarkably similar to a laser, can lead to an easier way of understanding the relevant operation circumstances. Instead of a feedback-built potent wave of electromagnetic radiation, a SASER delivers a potent sound wave. Some methods for sound amplification of GHz–THz have been proposed so far. Some have been explored only theoretically and others have been explored in non-coherent experiments.

We note that acoustic waves of 100 GHz to 1 THz have wavelengths in nanometre range. Sound amplification according to the experiment taken in the University of Nottingham could be based on an induced cascade of electrons in semiconductor superlattices. The energy levels of electrons are confined in the superlattice layers. As the electrons hop between gallium arsenide quantum wells in the superlattice they emit phonons. Then, one phonon going in, produces two phonons coming out of the superlattice. This process can be stimulated by other phonons and then give rise to an acoustic amplification. Upon the addition of electrons, short-wavelength (in the terahertz range) phonons are produced. Since the electrons are confined to the quantum wells existing within the lattice, the transmission of their energy depends upon the phonons they generate. As these phonons strike other layers in the lattice, they excite electrons, which produce further phonons, which go on to excite more electrons, and so on. Eventually, a very narrow beam of high-frequency ultrasound exits the device. Semiconductor superlattices are used as acoustic mirrors. These superlattice structures must be in the right size obeying the theory of multilayer distributed Bragg reflector, in similarity with multilayer dielectric mirrors in optics.

== Proposed schemes and devices ==
Basic understanding of the SASER development requires the evaluation of some proposed examples of SASER devices and SASER theoretical schemes.

=== Liquid with gas bubbles as the active medium ===
In this proposed theoretical scheme, the active medium is a liquid dielectric (e.g. ordinary distilled water) in which dispersed particles are uniformly distributed. Means of electrolysis cause gas bubbles that serve as the dispersed particles. A pumped wave excited in the active medium produces a periodic variation of the volumes of the dispersed particles (gas bubbles). Since, the initial spatial distribution of the particles is uniform, the waves emitted by the particles are added with different phases and give zero on the average. Nevertheless, if the active medium is located in a resonator, then a standing mode can be excited in it. Particles then bunch under the action of the acoustic radiation forces. In this case, the oscillations of the bubbles are self-synchronized and the useful mode amplifies.

The similarity of this with the free-electron laser is useful to understand the theoretical concepts of the scheme. In a FEL, electrons move through magnetic periodic systems producing electromagnetic radiation. The radiation of the electrons is initially incoherent but then on account of the interaction with the useful electromagnetic wave they start to bunch according to phase and they become coherent. Thus, the electromagnetic field is amplified.

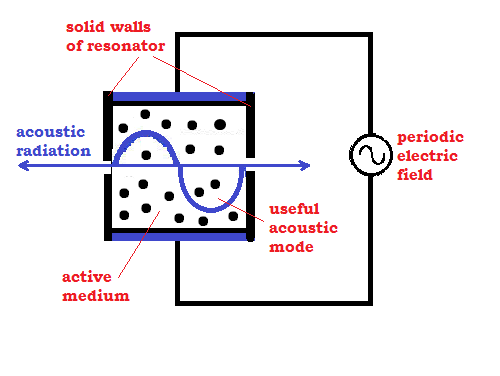
Diagram of an electrically pumped SASER − The active medium is limited in a resonator by solid walls. An electromagnetic system produces a periodic electric field inducing useful acoustic mode and acoustic radiation.

We note that, in the case of the piezoelectric radiators usually used to generate ultrasound, only the working surface radiates and therefore the working system is two-dimensional. On the other hand, a sound amplification by stimulated emission of radiation device is a three-dimensional system, since the entire volume of the active medium radiates.

The active medium gas–liquid mixture fills the resonator. The bubble density in the liquid is initially distributed uniformly in space. Since the wave propagates in such a medium, the pump wave leads to the appearance of an additional quasi-periodic wave. This wave is coupled with the spatial variation of the bubble density under the action of radiation pressure forces. Hence, the wave amplitude and the bubble density vary slowly compared with the period of the oscillations.

In the theoretical scheme where the usage of resonators is essential, the SASER radiation passes through the resonator walls, which are perpendicular to the direction of propagation of the pump wave. According to an example of an electrically pumped SASER, the active medium is confined between two planes, which are defined by the solid walls of the resonator. The radiation then, propagates along an axis parallel to the plane defined by the two resonator walls. The static electric field acting on the liquid with gas bubbles results in the deformation of dielectrics and therefore leads to a change in the volumes of the particles. We note that, the electromagnetic waves in the medium propagate with a velocity much greater than the velocity of sound in the same medium. This results to the assumption that the effective pump wave acting on the bubbles does not depend on the spatial coordinates. The pressure of a wave pump in the system leads to both the appearance of a backward wave and a dynamical instability of the system.

Mathematical analyses have shown that two types of losses must be overcome for generation of oscillations to start. Losses of the first type are associated with the dispersion of energy inside the active medium and second type losses are due to radiation losses at the ends of the resonator. These types of losses are inversely proportional to the amount of energy stored in the resonator. In general, the disparity of the radiators does not play a role in any attempt of a mathematical calculation of the starting conditions. Bubbles with resonance frequencies close to the pump frequency make the main contribution to the gain of the useful mode. In contrast, the determination of the starting pressure in ordinary lasers is independent from the number of radiators. The useful mode grows with the number of particles but sound absorption increases at the same time. Both these factors neutralize each other. Bubbles play the main role in the energy dispersion in a SASER.

A relevant suggested scheme of sound amplification by stimulated emission of radiation using gas bubbles as the active medium was introduced around 1995 The pumping is created by mechanical oscillations of a cylindrical resonator and the phase bunching of bubbles is realized by acoustic radiation forces. A notable fact is that gas bubbles can only oscillate under an external action, but not spontaneously. According to other proposed schemes, the electrostriction oscillations of the dispersed particle volumes in the cylindrical resonator are realized by an alternating electromagnetic field. However, a SASER scheme with an alternating electric field as the pump has a limitation. A very large amplitude of electric field (up to tens of kV/cm) is required to realize the amplification. Such values approach the electric puncture intensity of liquid dielectrics. Hence, a study proposes a SASER scheme without this limitation. The pumping is created by radial mechanical pulsations of a cylinder. This cylinder contains an active medium—a liquid dielectric with gas bubbles. The radiation emits through the faces of the cylinder.

=== Narrow-gap indirect semiconductors and excitons in coupled quantum wells ===
A proposal for the development of a phonon laser on resonant phonon transitions has been introduced from a group in Institute of Spectroscopy in Moscow, Russia. Two schemes for steady stimulated phonon generation were mentioned. The first scheme exploits a narrow-gap indirect semiconductor or analogous indirect gap semiconductor heterostructure where the tuning into resonance of one-phonon transition of electron–hole recombination can be carried out by external pressure, magnetic or electric fields. The second scheme uses one-phonon transition between direct and indirect exciton levels in coupled quantum wells. We note that an exciton is an electrically neutral quasiparticle that describes an elementary excitation of condensed matter. It can transport energy without transporting net electric charge. The tuning into the resonance of this transition can be accomplished by engineering of dispersion of indirect exciton by external in-plane magnetic and normal electric fields.

Brillouin zones, a) in a square lattice, and b) in a hexagonal lattice

The magnitude of phonon wave vector in the second proposed scheme, is supposed to be determined by magnitude of in-plane magnetic field. Therefore, such kind of SASER is tunable (i.e. its wavelength of operation can be altered in a controlled manner).

Common semiconductor lasers can be realised only in direct gap semiconductors. The reasoning behind that is that a pair of electron and hole near minima of their bands in an indirect gap semiconductor can recombine only with production of a phonon and a photon, due to energy and momentum conservation laws. This kind of process is weak in comparison with electron–hole recombination in a direct semiconductor. Consequently, the pumping of these transitions has to be very intense so as to obtain a steady laser generation. Hence, the lasing transition with production of only one particle – photon – must be resonant. This means that the lasing transition must be allowed by momentum and energy conservation laws to generate in a steady form. Photons have negligible wave vectors and therefore the band extremes have to be in the same position of the Brillouin zone . On the other hand, for devices such as SASERs, acoustic phonons have a considerable dispersion. According to dynamics, this leads to the statement that the levels on which the laser should operate, must be in the k-space relatively to each other. K-space refers to a space where things are in terms of momentum and frequency instead of position and time. The conversion between real space and k-space is a mathematical transformation called the Fourier transform and thus k-space can be also called Fourier space.

We note that, the difference in energy of the photon lasing levels has to be at least smaller than the Debye energy in the semiconductor. Here we can think of the Debye energy as the maximum energy associated with the vibrational modes of the lattice. Such levels can be formed by conduction and valence bands in narrow gap indirect semiconductors.

==== Narrow-gap indirect semiconductor as a SASER system ====
The energy gap in a semiconductor under the influence of pressure or magnetic field slightly varies and thus does not deserve any consideration. On the other hand, in narrow-gap semiconductors this variation of energy is considerable and therefore external pressure or magnetic field may serve the purpose of tuning into the resonance of one-phonon interband transition. Note that interband transition is the transition between the conduction and valence band. This scheme considers of indirect semiconductors instead of direct semiconductors. The reasoning behind that comes from the fact that, due to the k-selection rule in semiconductors, interband transitions with the production of only one phonon can be only those that produce an optical phonon. However, optical phonons have a short lifetime (they split into two due to anharmonicity) and therefore they add some important complications. Here we can note that even in the case of multi-stage process of acoustic phonon creation it is possible to create SASER.

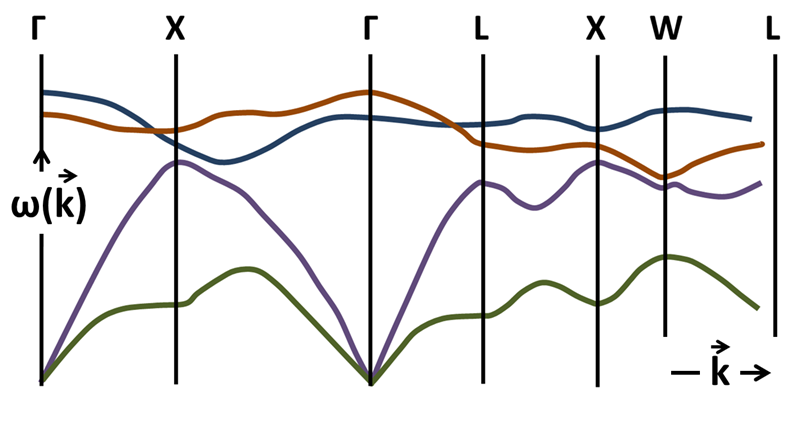
Dispersion relation ω=ω(k) for some waves corresponding to lattice vibrations in GaAs.

Examples of narrow-gap indirect semiconductors that can be used are chalcogenides PbTe, PbSe and PbS with energy gap 0.15 – 0.3 eV. For the same scheme, the usage of a semiconductor heterostructure (layers of different semiconductors) with narrow gap indirect in momentum space between valence and conduction bands may be more effective. This could be more promising since the spatial separation of the layers provides a possibility of tuning the interband transition into resonance by an external electric field. An essential statement here is that this proposed phonon laser can operate only if the temperature is much lower than the energy gap in the semiconductor.

During the analysis of this theoretical scheme several assumptions were introduced for simplicity reasons. The method of the pumping keeps the system electro-neutral and the dispersion laws of electrons and holes are assumed to be parabolic and isotropic. Also phonon dispersion law is required to be linear and isotropic too. Since the entire system is electro-neutral, the process of pumping creates electrons and holes with the same rate. A mathematical analysis, leads to an equation for the average number of electron–hole pairs per one phonon mode per unit volume. For a low loss limit, this equation gives us a pumping rate for the SASER that is rather moderate in comparison with usual phonon lasers on a p–n transition.

==== Tunable exciton transition in coupled quantum wells ====
It has been mentioned that a quantum well is basically a potential well that confines particles to move in two dimensions instead of three, forcing them to occupy a planar region. In coupled quantum wells there are two possible ways for electrons and holes to be bound into an exciton: indirect exciton and direct exciton. In indirect exciton, electrons and holes are in different quantum wells, in contrast with direct exciton where electrons and holes are located in the same well. In a case where the quantum wells are identical, both levels have a two-fold degeneracy. Direct exciton level is lower than the level of indirect exciton because of greater Coulomb interaction. Also, indirect exciton has an electric dipole momentum normal to coupled quantum well and thus a moving indirect exciton has an in-plane magnetic momentum perpendicular to its velocity. Any interactions of its electric dipole with normal electric field, lowers one of indirect exciton sub-levels and in sufficiently strong electric fields the moving indirect exciton becomes the ground excitonic level. Having in mind these procedures, one can select velocity to have an interaction between magnetic dipole and in-plane magnetic field. This displaces the minimum of the dispersion law away from the radiation zone. The importance of this, lies on the fact that electric and in-plane magnetic fields normal to coupled quantum wells, can control the dispersion of indirect exciton. Normal electric field is needed for tuning the transition: direct exciton → indirect exciton + phonon into resonance and its magnitude can form a linear function with the magnitude of in-plane magnetic field. We note that the mathematical analysis of this scheme considers of longitudinal acoustic (LA) phonons instead of transverse acoustic (TA) phonons. This aims to more simple numerical estimations. Generally, the preference in transverse acoustic (TA) phonons is better because TA phonons have lower energy and the greater life-time than LA phonons. Therefore, their interaction with the electronic subsystem is weak. In addition, simpler quantitative evaluations require a pumping of direct exciton level performed by a laser irradiation.

A further analysis of the scheme can help us to establish differential equations for direct exciton, indirect exciton and phonon modes. The solution of these equations gives that separately phonon and indirect exciton modes have no definite phase and only the sum of their phases is defined. The aim here is to check if the operation of this scheme with a rather moderate pumping rate can hold against the fact that excitons in coupled quantum wells have low dimensionality in comparison to phonons. Hence, phonons not confined in the coupled quantum well are considered. An example is longitudinal optical (LO) phonons that are in AlGaAs/GaAs heterostructure and thus, phonons presented in this proposed system are three-dimensional. Differences in dimensionalities of phonons and excitons cause upper level to transform into many states of phonon field. By applying this information to specific equations we can conclude to a desired result. There is no additional requirement for the laser pumping despite the difference in phonon and exciton dimensionalities.

=== A tunable two-level system ===
Phonon laser action has been stated in a wide range of physical systems (e.g. semiconductors). A 2012 publication from the Department of Applied Physics in California Institute of Technology (Caltech), introduces a demonstration of a compound micro-cavity system, coupled with a radio-frequency mechanical mode, which operates in close analogy to a two-level laser system.

This compound micro-cavity system can also be called "photonic molecule". Hybridized orbitals of an electrical system are replaced by optical supermodes of this photonic molecule while the transitions between their corresponding energy levels are induced by a phonon field. For typical conditions of the optical micro-resonators, the photonic molecule behaves as a two-level laser system. Nevertheless, there is a bizarre inversion between the roles of the active medium and the cavity modes (laser field). The medium becomes purely optical and the laser field is provided by the material as a phonon mode.

An inversion produces gain, causing phonon laser action above a pump power threshold of around 7 μW. The proposed device is characterized from a continuously tunable gain spectrum that selectively amplifies mechanical modes from radio frequency to microwave rates. Viewed as Brillouin process, the system accesses a regime in which the phonon plays the role of Stokes wave. Stokes wave refers to a non-linear and periodic surface wave on an inviscid fluid (ideal fluid assumed to have no viscosity) layer of constant mean depth. For this reason it should be also possible to controllably switch between phonon and phonon laser regimes.

Compound optical microcavity systems provide beneficial spectral controls. These controls impact both phonon laser action and cooling and define some finely spaced optical levels whose transition energies are proportional to phonon energies. These level spacings are continuously tunable by a significant adjustment of optical coupling. Therefore, amplification and cooling occur around a tunable line center, in contrast with some cavity optomechanical phenomena. The creation of these finely spaced levels does not require increasing the optical microcavity dimensions. Hence, these finely spaced levels do not affect the optomechanical interaction strength in a significant degree. The approach uses intermodal coupling, induced by radiation pressure and can also provide a spectrally selective mean to detect phonons. Moreover, some evidences of intermodal cooling are observed in this kind of experiments and thus, there is an interest in optomechanical cooling. Overall, an extension to multilevel systems using multiple coupled resonators is possible.

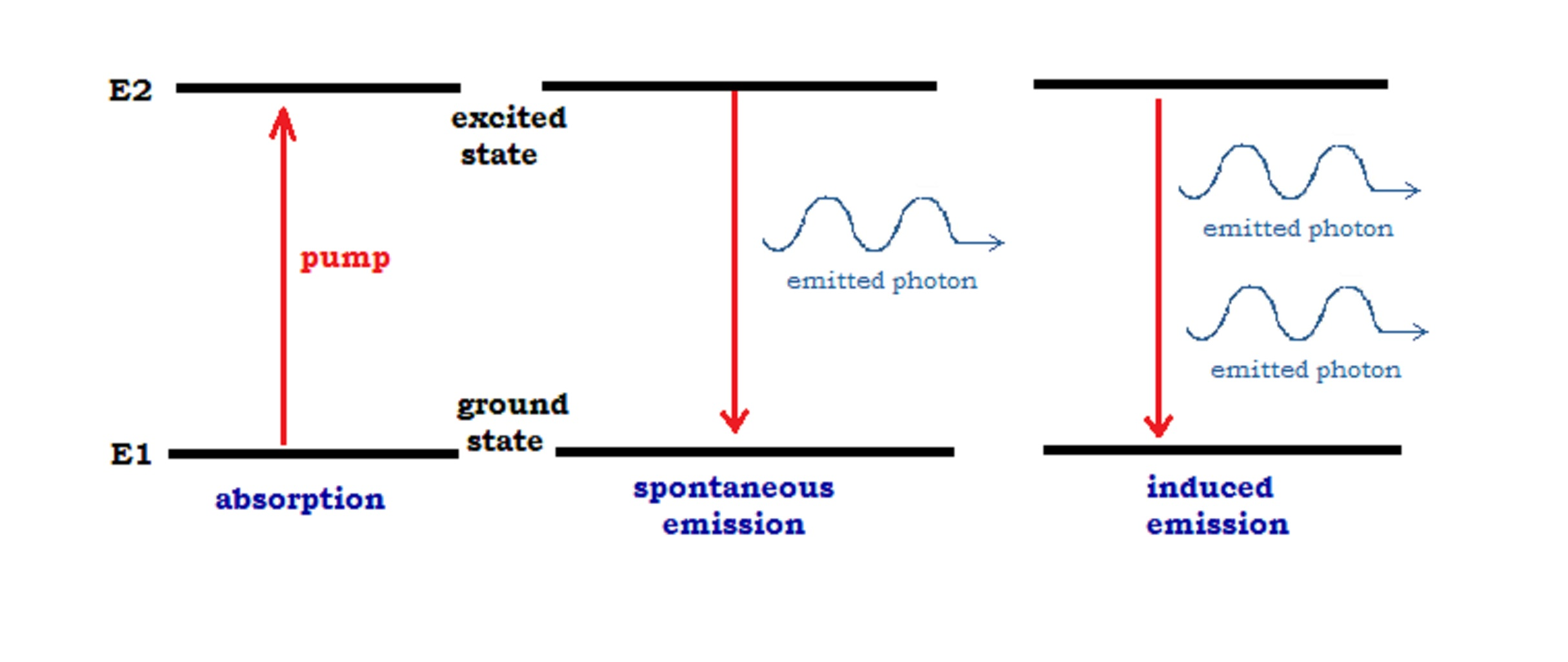
A representation of the two level system. We can see the induced absorption, the spontaneous emission and the induced emission

==== Two-level system ====
In a two level system, the particles have only two available energy levels, separated by some energy difference: ΔΕ = E_{2} − E_{1} = hv, where ν is the frequency of the associated electromagnetic wave of the photon emitted and h is the Planck constant. Also note: E_{2} > E_{1}. These two levels are the excited (upper) and ground (lower) states. When a particle in the upper state interacts with a photon matching the energy separation of the levels, the particle may decay, emitting another photon with the same phase and frequency as the incident photon. Therefore, by pumping energy into the system we can have a stimulated emission of radiation—which means that the pump forces the system to release a big amount of energy at a specific time. A fundamental characteristic of lasing, like the population inversion, is not actually possible in a two-level system and therefore a two-level laser is not possible. In a two-level atom the pump is, in a way, the laser itself.

=== Coherent terahertz amplification in a Stark ladder superlattice ===
The amplification of coherent terahertz sound in a Wannier–Stark ladder superlattice has been achieved in 2009 according to a paper publication from the School of Physics and Astronomy in the University of Nottingham. Wannier–Stark effect, exists in superlattices. Electron states in quantum wells respond sensitively to moderate electric fields either by the quantum confined Stark effect in the case of wide barriers or by Wannier-Stark localization in the case of a superlattice. Both effects lead to large changes of the optical properties near the absorption edge, which are useful for intensity modulation and optical switching. Namely, in a mathematical point of view, if an electric field is applied to a superlattice the relevant Hamiltonian exhibits an additional scalar potential. If an eigenstate exists, then the states corresponding to wave functions are eigenstates of the Hamiltonian as well. These states are equally spaced both in energy and real space and form the so-called Wannier–Stark ladder.

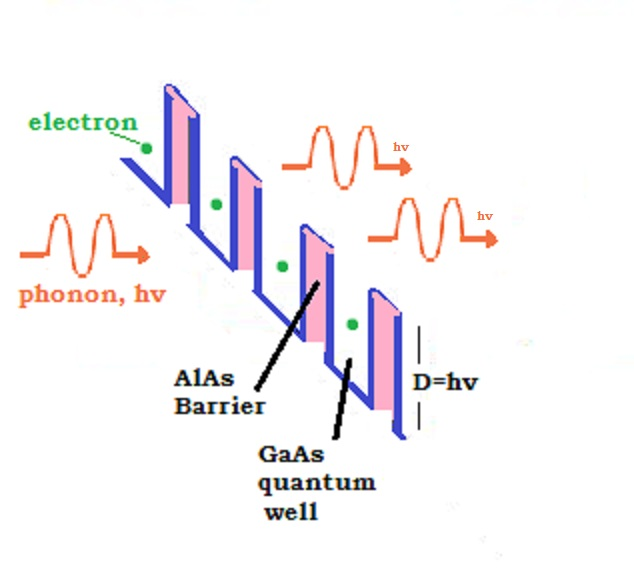
Stimulated emission of phonons. As the electrons hop between GaAs and AlAs quantum wells in the superlattice they emit phonons. This process is stimulated by other phonons giving rise to the acoustic amplification

In the proposed scheme, an application of an electrical bias to a semiconductor superlattice is increasing the amplitude of coherent folded phonons generated by an optical pulse. This increase of the amplitude is observed for those biases in which the energy drop per period of the superlattice is greater than the phonon energy. If the superlattice is biased such that the energy drop per period of the superlattice exceeds the width of electronic minibands (Wannier–Stark regime), the electrons become localized in the quantum wells and vertical electron transport takes place via hopping between neighboring quantum wells, which may be phonon assisted. As it had been shown previously, under these conditions stimulated phonon emission can become the dominant phonon-assisted hoping process for phonons of an energy value close to the Stark splitting. Thus, coherent phonon amplification is theoretically possible in this type of system. Together with the increase in amplitude, the spectrum of the bias-induced oscillations is narrower than the spectrum of the coherent phonons at zero bias. This shows that coherent amplification of phonons due to stimulated emission takes place in the structure under electrical pumping.

A bias voltage is applied to a weakly coupled n-doped GaAs/AlAs superlattice and increases the amplitude of the coherent hypersound oscillations generated by a femtosecond optical pulse. An evidence of hypersound amplification by stimulated emission of phonons emerges, in a system where the inversion of the electron populations for phonon-assisted transitions exists. This evidence is provided by the bias-induced amplitude increase and experimentally observer spectral narrowing of the superlattice phonon mode with a frequency of 441 GHz.

The main target of this type of experiments is to highlight the realization probability of a coherent amplification of THz sound. The THz stimulated phonon induced transitions between the electron superlattice states lead to this coherent amplification while processing a population inversion.

An essential step towards coherent generation ("sasing") of THz sound and other active hypersound devices has been provided by this achievement of THz sound amplification. Generally, in a device where the threshold for "sasing" is achieved, the technique described by this proposed scheme could be used to measure the coherence time of the emitted hypersound.

== See also ==
- Acoustics
- Laser
- Maser
- Optoelectronics
- Ultrasound

== Further reading and works referred to ==
- B.A. Glavin, V.A. Kochelap, T.L. Linnik, P. Walker, A.J. Kentand M. Henini, Monochromatic terahertz acoustic phonon emission from piezoelectric superlattices, Jour. Phys. Cs 92 (2007).
- K. Vahala, M. Herrmann, S. Knunz, V. Batteiger, G. Saathoff, T. W. Hansch and Th. Udem, A phonon Laser
- Phil Schewe; Ben Stein. "A New Kind of Acoustic Laser". Physics News Update. American Institute of Physics (AIP). Archived from the original on June 25, 2006.
