= Girish Saran Agarwal =

Indian physicist

Girish Saran Agarwal FRS
- Born: 7 July 1946 (age 79); Bareilly, India
- Awards: Max Born Award
- Scientific career
- Fields: theoretical physics
- Thesis: A c-number calculus for functions of non-commuting operators and phase space representation of quantum dynamical systems. (1969)
- Website: baen.tamu.edu/people/agarwal-girish/

Girish S. Agarwal, Fellow of the Royal Society UK, (born 7 July 1946) is a theoretical physicist. He is currently at the Texas A & M University with affiliations to the Departments of Biological and Agricultural Engineering, Physics and Astronomy, and the Institute for Quantum Science and Engineering. Earlier he worked as Noble Foundation Chair and the Regents Professor at the Oklahoma State University. He is a recognized leader in the field of quantum optics and also has made major contributions to the fields of nonlinear optics, nanophotonics and plasmonics. In 2013 he published the textbook "Quantum Optics", covering a wide range of recent developments in the field, which has been well received by the community.

== Life ==
Born in Bareilly, India, Agarwal studied physics at the Gorakhpur University, Gorakhpur, India, (BSc in 1964) and Banaras Hindu University in Varanasi, India, (MSc in 1966). In 1969, he received his PhD from the University of Rochester, USA, followed by post-doctoral appointments at the University of Rochester, the University of Stuttgart, Germany, and The Tata Institute of Fundamental Research, Mumbai, India. In 1974, at the age of 28, he published his first monograph "Quantum Statistical Theories of Spontaneous Emission and their Relation to other Approaches" at Springer. This book on light–matter interaction and spontaneous decay has since been a standard reference for quantum optics researchers worldwide.

After a few years at the Tata Institute of Fundamental Research and the Institute of Science, Mumbai, India, he was appointed in 1977 full professor at the University of Hyderabad, India, where he had the major responsibility to set up the School of Physics. In 1995, Girish S. Agarwal was appointed Director and Distinguished Scientist of the Physical Research Laboratory (PRL), Ahmedabad, India. From 1995 - 2000 he served additionally as Honorary Professor at the Jawaharlal Nehru Centre for Advanced Scientific Research, Bangalore, India, and from 2001 - 2005 held the Einstein Centenary Research Professorship of the Indian National Science Academy. Numerous guest professorships have taken him to the major centers of optics and quantum optics throughout the world, including the University of Rochester, Texas A & M University, College Station, the University of Colorado, Boulder, the Max-Planck Institute for Quantum Optics, Garching, Germany, the Max-Planck Institute for the Science of Light, Erlangen, Germany, the Universities of Essen, Ulm, and Erlangen, Germany, the Technical University of Vienna, Austria, and the University of Manchester, UK.

As a scientist he served the international optics and quantum optics community by organizing schools and symposia, e.g., at the International Center for Theoretical Physics (ICTP), Trieste, Italy, for the benefit of the scientists from third world countries. He also spearheaded the efforts of the Indian Government's Department of Science and Technology to build up the infrastructure in the Physics Departments of Indian Universities. He also has served on the editorial board of various leading journals in optics and quantum optics, including Physical Review A.

== Awards ==
Girish S. Agarwal has received awards for his achievements in the field of optics and quantum optics. This includes the Humboldt Research Award, Germany (1997), the Max-Born Award of the Optical Society of America, USA (1988), the Einstein Medal of the Optical and Quantum Electronics Society, USA (1994), The World Academy of Sciences Prize in Physics (1994), the Shanti Swaroop Bhatnagar Award in Physical Sciences by the Government of India (1982) the Honoris causa of the University of Liege, Belgium (2007), and of the University of Hyderabad, India (2011), the Charles Hard Townes Award (2022), an Elected Fellow of The World Academy of Sciences (1997), an Elected Fellow of the Indian National Science Academy, New Delhi (1985), an Elected Fellow of the Optical Society of America (1986), an Elected Fellow of the Indian Academy of Sciences, Bangalore (1981), and an Elected Fellow of the American Physical Society (1981). He was invited to the Sir JC Bose Chair at the Indian Institute of Science Education and Research (IISER), Pune, India, and the JRD Tata Chair at The Tata Institute of Fundamental Research, Mumbai, India. In 2012 he was recognized by the Oklahoma State University by the "Eminent Faculty Award".

== Selected publications ==
- Quantum statistical theories of spontaneous emission and their relation to other approaches, Springer Tracts in Modern Physics Band 70, 1974
- Quantum Optics, Cambridge University Press 2012
- Publisher Selected Papers on Fundamentals of Quantum Optics, SPIE Press 1995
- Publisher Selected Papers on Resonant and Collective Phenomena in Quantum Optics, SPIE Press 1995
