= Elias Snitzer =

American physicist (1925 – 2012)

Elias Snitzer (27 February 1925 – 21 May 2012) was an American physicist known for his early work on fiber lasers. He was a Charles Hard Townes Award winner.

Snitzer was born in Lynn, Massachusetts. He studied at Tufts University, graduating with a bachelor's degree in 1945. He obtained a master's degree in 1950 at the University of Chicago followed by a doctorate in 1953. He then worked in research at the Minneapolis-Honeywell Regulator Company until 1956. From 1956 to 1958 he was Associate Professor of Electronics at the Lowell Technological Institute, and in 1959 at the Massachusetts Institute of Technology. From 1959, he conducted research at the American Optical Corporation, where he was head of basic research from 1968 and director of research from 1975. In 1977 he became research manager at United Technologies Corporation (where he was initially in Anthony DeMaria's group) and from 1984 to 1988 he was head of the Fiber Optics and Integrated Optics Department at Polaroid Corporation, where he invented the double-clad glass fiber. In 1989, he became a professor at Rutgers University, where he retired in 1997.

Snitzer was married in 1950, and had five children.

== Awards and recognitions ==
In 1979 Snitzer received the Quantum Electronics Award of the IEEE. In 1991, he was awarded the Charles Hard Townes Award for "his pioneering contributions to solid state lasers and fiber optics, in particular, neodymium-glass and erbium-glass lasers, the first fiber optic laser, and for innovative contributions to fiber optic amplifiers and fiber optic lasers." He won the John Tyndall Award in 1994, in 1999 the Otto Schott Prize, and in 2000 the Rank Prize. Snitzer was a member of the National Academy of Engineering and a Fellow of the American Physical Society, the IEEE and the Optical Society of America.
