= Bulletin of the Lebedev Physics Institute =

- Discipline: Physics
- Language: Russian, English
- Edited by: Oleg N. Krokhin

Publication details
- History: 1970–present
- Publisher: Lebedev Physics Institute, Springer (Russia)
- Frequency: Monthly

Standard abbreviations
- ISO 4: Bull. Lebedev Phys. Inst.

Indexing
- ISSN: 1068-3356 (print); 1934-838X (web)

Links
- {{{link1-name}}}

Bulletin of the Lebedev Physics Institute (Russian: Краткие сообщения по физике, Kratkue Soobsheniya po fisike) is a peer-reviewed scientific journal of physics. The journal was established in 1970, and is published by the Lebedev Physical Institute (in Russian) a monthly basis. Springer publishes an English translation of the journal. It is edited by Oleg N. Krokhin. The online version is available since 2007.

The Bulletin covers research results from A. M. Prokhorov General Physics Institute and the Institute for Nuclear Research of the Russian Academy of Sciences in addition to those of the Lebedev Physical Institute.

== Indexing ==
Bulletin of the Lebedev Physics Institute is abstracted and indexed in the following databases:

- Academic OneFile
- EI-Compendex
- Expanded Academic
- Google Scholar
- Inspec
- Journal Citation Reports/Science Edition
- OCLC
- Science Citation Index Expanded
- Summon by Serial Solutions
