= Herbert Zeiger =

American physicist

Herbert J. Zeiger (b. 16 March 1925 in the Bronx, New York City, United States; d. 14 January 2011) was an American physicist and co-developer of the first maser.

Zeiger graduated from the City College of New York with a bachelor's degree in 1944, and Columbia University with a master's degree in 1948 and a doctorate in 1952. From 1953 until his retirement in 1990, he conducted research at the Lincoln Laboratory of the Massachusetts Institute of Technology. He lived most recently in Newton, Mass., and then in Dedham, Mass. He is buried in West Roxbury.

In addition to the physics behind the maser and laser, Zeiger dealt with solid-state physics, semiconductor physics, and molecular physics.

Between 1953-54, he worked alongside Charles H. Townes and James P. Gordon, who was then a PhD student of Townes, at Columbia University to develop the first maser.

In 1966, Zeiger became a Fellow of the American Physical Society. He and Gordon were the recipients of the first Charles Hard Townes Award in 1981, "For [their] contributions to the successful operations of the first quantum-electronics device, the ammonia maser".

He was married to Hanna Bloom and had three children: Joel Zeiger, Susan Zeiger Katz, and Judith Zeiger McNulty.
