= Chung Liang Tang =

Chinese-born American applied physicist (1934–2022)

Chung Liang Tang (Chinese: 湯仲良; 14 May 1934 – 31 May 2022) was a Chinese-born American applied physicist.

Tang was born in China, and moved to avoid hostilities in the Second Sino-Japanese War and the Chinese Communist Revolution, making his way to San Francisco via Taiwan in 1950. He completed a bachelor's degree from the University of Washington (1955), a master's of science degree from Caltech (1956), and a doctorate at Harvard University (1960), then pursued postdoctoral research at RWTH Aachen University.

Tang worked for Raytheon from 1960 to 1964, then joined the Cornell University faculty as an associate professor. He was promoted to a full professorship in 1968, and subsequently appointed the Spencer T. Olin Professor of Engineering in 1985. Tang retired from Cornell in 2008.

Tang was elected a fellow of the American Physical Society in 1975, the Institute of Electrical and Electronics Engineers in 1977, the Optical Society of America in 1986, and a member of the United States National Academy of Engineering and of Academia Sinica in 1986 and 1994, respectively. He was the 1996 recipient of the OSA's Charles Hard Townes Award, recognized "for seminal and pioneering advances in the field of nonlinear optics and laser physics".

Tang was married to Louise, a mathematics instructor at Ithaca College. He died on 31 May 2022, aged 88.
