= Lebedev Physical Institute =

Russian science institute

Coordinates: 55°41′52″N 37°33′55″E

- Russian: Физи́ческий институ́т имени П. Н. Ле́бедева Российской академии наук (ФИАН)
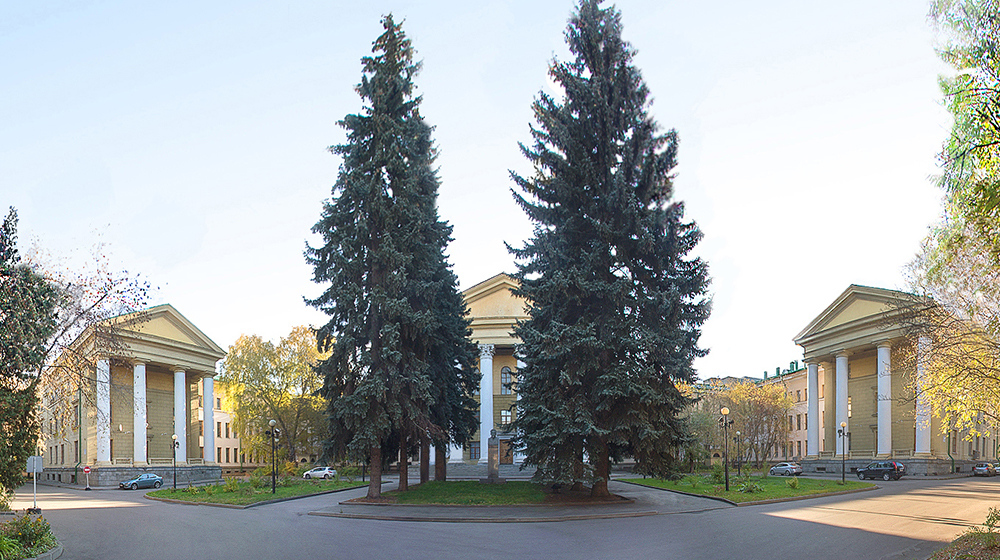

Agency overview
- Formed: 1934
- Headquarters: 119991, Moscow, Leninsky Avenue, 53
- Employees: 1600
- Agency executive: Nikolai Kolachevsky, director
- Parent agency: Russian Academy of Sciences
- Website: lebedev.ru (in Russian)

The Lebedev Physical Institute of the Russian Academy of Sciences (Russian: Физи́ческий институ́т имени П. Н. Ле́бедева Российской академии наук) is a Russian research institute in Moscow, specializing in physics. The institute was established in its present shape in 1934 by academician Sergey Vavilov. It moved to Moscow and was named after a Russian physicist Pyotr Lebedev the same year. It is also known as P. N. Lebedev Institute of Physics or just Lebedev Institute. In Russian it is often referred to by the acronym FIAN (ФИАН) standing for "Physical Institute of the Academy of Sciences". The range of the research activities includes: laser technology, dark matter structure, nanostructures, superconductivity, cosmic rays, and gamma-astronomy. The institute developed a technique of crystallizing cubic zirconia (which was called Fianit in Russia, named after FIAN).

== Directors of the Institute ==
1. Sergey Vavilov (1934–1951)
2. Dmitri Skobeltsyn (1951–1972)
3. Nikolay Basov (1973–1988)
4. Leonid Keldysh (1989–1994)
5. Oleg Krokhin (1994–2004)
6. Gennady Mesyats (2004–2015)
7. Nikolai Kolachevsky (2015–)

== Nobel prizes awarded to FIAN scientists ==
- 1958 — Pavel Cherenkov, Igor Tamm, Ilya Frank: "for the discovery and the interpretation of the Cherenkov-Vavilov effect".
- 1964 — Nikolay Basov, Alexander Prokhorov: "for fundamental work in the field of quantum electronics, which has led to the construction of oscillators and amplifiers based on the maser-laser principle".
- 1975 — Andrei Sakharov won a Peace Prize for his campaigning for human rights.
- 2003 — Vitaly Ginzburg: "for pioneering contributions to the theory of superconductors and superfluids".

== Facilities ==
The institute has, among other research facilities, a particle accelerator: 1.2 GeV electron synchrotron called "Pakhra", located in Troitsk near Moscow (at the LPI's HEP department).

Andreyev Acoustics Institute is part of the Institute, and is named for Nikolay Andreyev.

== Publications of the Institute ==
- "Краткие сообщения по физике" (in Russian); English version: Bulletin of the Lebedev Physics Institute
- "Квантовая электроника" (in Russian); English translation: Quantum Electronics (formerly Soviet Journal of Quantum Electronics)

== See also ==
- A. M. Prokhorov General Physics Institute
- Pushchino Radio Astronomy Observatory
