= Charles H. Townes =

American physicist (1915–2015)

Charles Townes
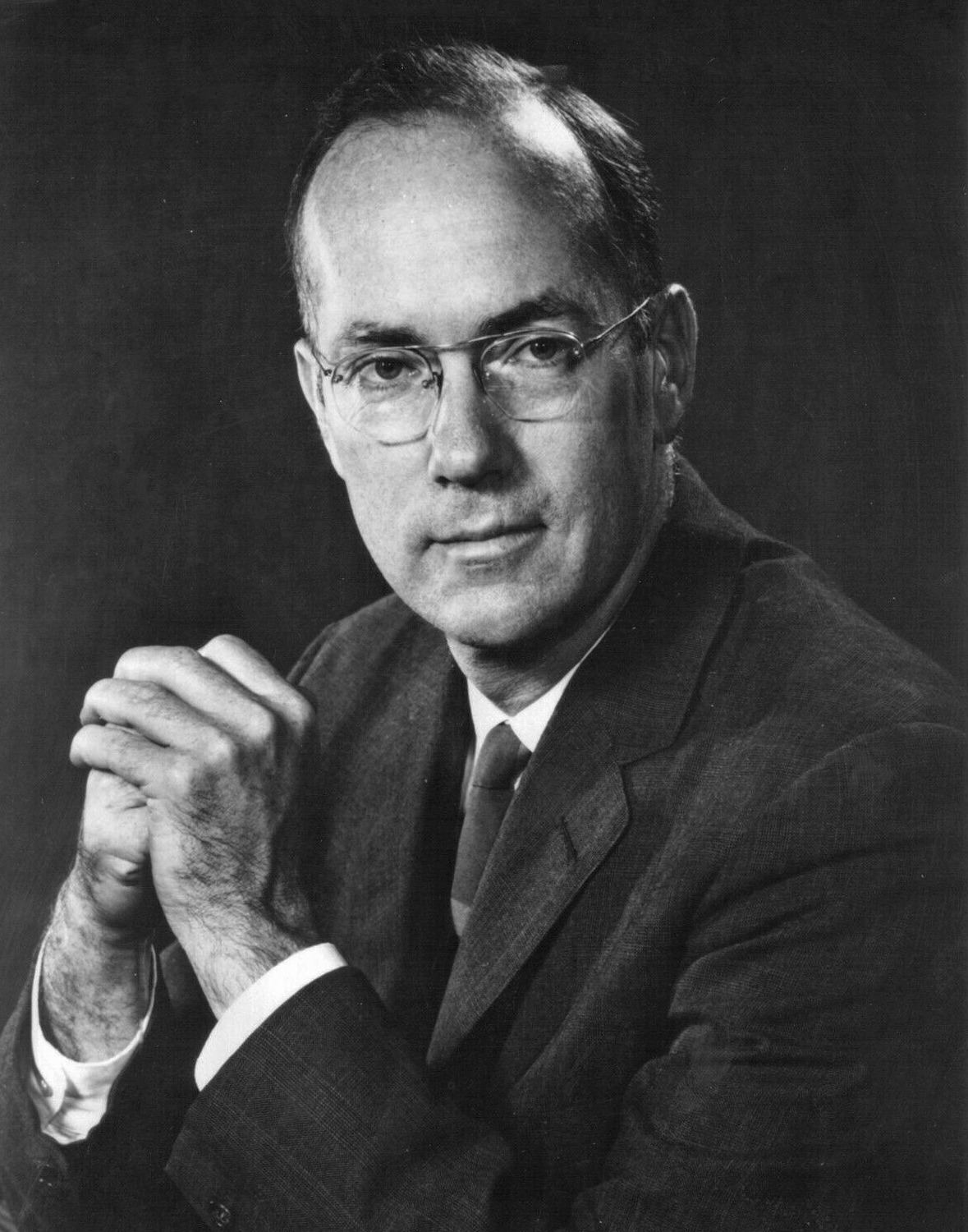
- Townes in 1983
- Born: Charles Hard Townes; July 28, 1915; Greenville, South Carolina, US
- Died: January 27, 2015 (aged 99); Oakland, California, US
- Education: Furman University (BS, BA); Duke University (MA); California Institute of Technology (PhD)
- Known for: Invention of the maser
- Spouse: Frances Brown (m. 1941)
- Children: 4
- Relatives: Henry Keith Townes (brother)
- Awards: Comstock Prize in Physics (1958); IRE Morris Liebmann Memorial Prize (1959); John J. Carty Award for the Advancement of Science (1961); Stuart Ballantine Medal (1962); Nobel Prize in Physics (1964); IEEE Medal of Honor (1967); Wilhelm Exner Medal (1970); Earle K. Plyler Prize (1977); Niels Bohr International Gold Medal (1979); National Medal of Science (1982); Frederic Ives Medal (1996); Lomonosov Gold Medal (2000); Templeton Prize (2005); SPIE Gold Medal (2010); Golden Goose Award (2012)
- Scientific career
- Fields: Laser science
- Workplaces: Bell Telephone Laboratories; Columbia University; Institute for Defense Analyses; Massachusetts Institute of Technology; University of California, Berkeley
- Thesis: Concentration of the heavy isotope of carbon and measurement of its nuclear spin (1939)
- Doctoral advisor: William Smythe
- Doctoral students: Isaac Abella; Robert W. Boyd; Raymond Chiao; Elsa M. Garmire; James P. Gordon; Ali Javan; Arno Allan Penzias; Patrick Thaddeus

Charles Hard Townes (July 28, 1915 – January 27, 2015) was an American physicist. Townes worked on the theory and application of the maser, for which he obtained the fundamental patent, and other work in quantum electronics associated with both maser and laser devices. He shared the 1964 Nobel Prize in Physics with Nikolay Basov and Alexander Prokhorov. Townes was an adviser to the U.S. Government, meeting every President from Harry S. Truman (1945) to Bill Clinton (1999).

Townes directed the U.S. government's Science and Technology Advisory Committee for the Apollo lunar landing program. After becoming a professor of the University of California, Berkeley, in 1967, he began an astrophysical program that produced several important discoveries, for example, the black hole at the center of the Milky Way galaxy.

Townes was religious, and believed that science and religion are converging to provide a greater understanding of the nature and purpose of the universe.

== Early life and education ==
Charles Hard Townes was born on July 28, 1915, in Greenville, South Carolina, the son of Henry Keith Townes Sr. (1876–1958), an attorney, and Ellen Sumter Hard (1881–1980). His brother, Henry Keith Townes Jr., (1913–1990), was a renowned entomologist who was a world authority on Ichneumon wasps. Townes had German, Scottish, English, Welsh, Huguenot French, and Scotch Irish ancestry,

Charles earned a B.S. in Physics and a B.A. in Modern Languages from Furman University, where he graduated in 1935. Townes completed work for an M.A. in Physics at Duke University in 1937, and then began graduate school at the California Institute of Technology, from which he received his Ph.D. in 1939 with a thesis on isotope separation and nuclear spins. During World War II, he worked on radar bombing systems at Bell Telephone Laboratories.

== Career and research ==
In 1950, Townes was appointed professor at Columbia University. He served as executive director of the Columbia Radiation Laboratory from 1950 to 1952. He was Chairman of the Physics Department from 1952 to 1955.

External audio
- "The Man, the Myth, the Laser", Distillations Podcast, Science History Institute

In 1951, Townes conceived a new way to create intense, precise beams of coherent radiation, for which he invented the acronym maser (for Microwave Amplification by Stimulated Emission of Radiation). When the same principle was applied to higher frequencies, the term laser was used (the word "light" substituting for the word "microwave").

During 1953, Townes, James P. Gordon, and Herbert J. Zeiger built the first ammonia maser at Columbia University. This device used stimulated emission in a stream of energized ammonia molecules to produce amplification of microwaves at a frequency of about 24.0 gigahertz.

From 1959 to 1961, Townes was on leave of absence from Columbia University to serve as vice president and director of research of the Institute for Defense Analyses in Washington, D.C., a nonprofit organization, which advised the U.S. government and was operated by eleven universities. Between 1961 and 1967, he served as both Provost and Professor of Physics at the Massachusetts Institute of Technology. Then, during 1967, he was appointed Professor of Physics at the University of California, Berkeley, where he remained for almost 50 years; his status was as professor emeritus by the time of his death during 2015. Between 1966 and 1970, he was chairman of the NASA Science Advisory Committee for the Apollo lunar landing program.

For his creation of the maser, Townes along with Nikolay Basov and Alexander Prokhorov received the 1964 Nobel Prize in Physics. Townes also developed the use of masers and lasers for astronomy, was part of a team that first discovered complex molecules in space, and determined the mass of the supermassive black hole at the center of the Milky Way galaxy.

During 2002–2003, Townes served as a Karl Schwarzschild Lecturer in Germany and the Birla Lecturer and Schroedinger Lecturer in India.

Townes is one of the 20 American recipients of the Nobel Prize in Physics to sign a letter addressed to President George W. Bush in May 2008, urging him to "reverse the damage done to basic science research in the Fiscal Year 2008 Omnibus Appropriations Bill" by requesting additional emergency funding for the Department of Energy's Office of Science, the National Science Foundation, and the National Institute of Standards and Technology.

== Astrophysics ==
=== Galactic Center ===
The Galactic Center of the Milky Way had long puzzled astronomers, and thick dust obscures the view of it in visible light. During the mid to late 1970s, Townes together with Eric Wollman, John Lacy, Thomas Geballe and Fred Baas studied Sagittarius A, the H II region at the Galactic Center, at infrared wavelengths. They observed ionized neon gas swirling around the center at such velocities that the mass at the very center must be approximately equal to that of 3 million suns. Such a large mass in such a small space implied that the central object (the radio source Sagittarius A*) contains a supermassive black hole. Sagittarius A* was one of the first black holes detected; subsequently its mass has been more accurately determined to be 4.3 million solar masses.

=== Shapes and sizes of stars ===
His last major technological creation was the Infrared Spatial Interferometer with Walt Fitelson, Ed Wishnow and others. The project combined three mobile infrared detectors aligned by lasers that study the same star. If each telescope is 10 meters from the other, it creates an impression of a 30-meter lens. Observations of Betelgeuse, a red giant in the shoulder of the constellation Orion, found that it is increasing and decreasing in size at the rate of 1% per year, 15% over 15 years. ISI produces extremely high angular and spatial resolution. The technology is also playing an important role in the search for extraterrestrial life in collaborations with Dan Werthimer of Search for Extraterrestrial Intelligence (SETI).

== Public service and advocacy ==
Townes took part in the Pugwash discussions on arms control with Soviet scientists. He argued for controls on nuclear weapons, including a treaty to limit underground weapons tests, and in 1981 he chaired a panel that reviewed President Ronald Reagan's plans to deploy the MX missile.

In 1996 Townes was one of 60 Nobel laureates who wrote to President Bill Clinton and Congress to ask that federal funding for university research be maintained. He was also one of the 20 American recipients of the Nobel Prize in Physics to sign a letter addressed to President George W. Bush in May 2008, urging him to "reverse the damage done to basic science research in the Fiscal Year 2008 Omnibus Appropriations Bill" by requesting additional emergency funding for the Department of Energy's Office of Science, the National Science Foundation, and the National Institute of Standards and Technology.

Townes served on the board of directors of the Center for Theology and the Natural Sciences in Berkeley for more than twenty years, and in 2006 the center named a graduate fellowship after him. When he won the Templeton Prize in 2005, he said that he would give most of the $1.5 million prize to his alma mater, Furman University, and that he would also make large gifts to the Pacific School of Religion, the Center for Theology and the Natural Sciences, the Berkeley Ecumenical Chaplaincy to the Homeless and the First Congregational Church of Berkeley.

Townes was co-founder of the International Institute of Bengal and Himalayan Basins (IIBHB), a Berkeley nonprofit organization founded by the environmental scientist Rash Bihari Ghosh that works on drinking water and environmental problems in the Bengal and Himalayan river basins. The institute's annual seminar on the global water crisis at the University of California, Berkeley, was named the "Townes and Tagore" seminar after Townes and the Bengali poet Rabindranath Tagore. In IIBHB seminars, Townes said that Tagore's "pursuits always reflected his appreciation and respect for the beauty and goodness of nature," while also enjoining students to study the works of Tagore, Kalidasa, and Kazi Nazrul Islam, as well as the life of Netaji Subhas Chandra Bose. The Asiatic Society in Kolkata had awarded him its Rabindranath Tagore Birth Centenary Plaque in 1999.

== Personal life and legacy ==
Townes married Frances H. Brown, an activist for the homeless, during 1941. They lived in Berkeley, California and had four daughters: Linda Rosenwein, Ellen Anderson, Carla Kessler, and Holly Townes. Frances died in 2018 aged 101.

Several places are named after Townes. For example, in his hometown of Greenville, the Charles Townes Center for the Gifted and Talented was named after him, as well as the Charles H. Townes Center at Furman University.

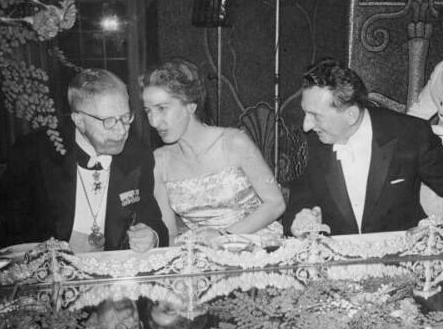
King Gustaf VI Adolf, Frances Townes and Alexander Prokhorov at the Nobel Prize banquet in 1964

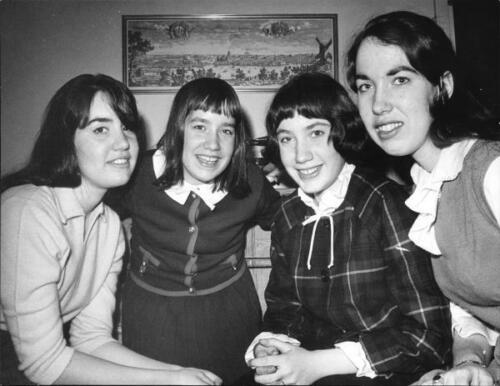
Daughters of Townes in Sweden in 1964

=== Science and religion ===
A religious man and a member of the United Church of Christ, Townes believed that "science and religion [are] quite parallel, much more similar than most people think and that in the long run, they must converge". He wrote in a statement after winning the Templeton Prize during 2005: "Science tries to understand what our universe is like and how it works, including us humans. Religion is aimed at understanding the purpose and meaning of our universe, including our own lives. If the universe has a purpose or meaning, this must be reflected in its structure and functioning, and hence in science."

Townes's opinions concerning science and religion were expounded in his essays "The Convergence of Science and Religion", "Logic and Uncertainties in Science and Religion", and his book Making Waves. He also lectured on the subject in India; in 1997 he gave the keynote address, "Do science and religion converge?", at the Second World Congress for the Synthesis of Science and Religion in Calcutta.

Townes felt that the beauty of nature is "obviously God-made" and that God created the universe for humans to emerge and flourish. He prayed every day and ultimately felt that religion is more important than science because it addresses the most important long-range question: the meaning and purpose of our lives. Townes's belief in the convergence of science and religion is based on claimed similarities:

1. Faith. Townes argued that the scientist has faith much like a religious person does, allowing him/her to work for years for an uncertain result.
2. Revelation. Townes claimed that many important scientific discoveries, like his invention of the maser/laser, occurred as a "flash" much more akin to religious revelation than interpreting data.
3. Proof. During this century the mathematician Kurt Gödel discovered that there can be no absolute proof in a scientific sense. Every proof requires a set of assumptions, and there is no way to check whether those assumptions are self-consistent because other assumptions would be required.
4. Uncertainty. Townes believed that we should be open-minded to a better understanding of science and religion in the future. This will require us to modify our theories, but not abandon them. For example, at the start of the 20th century physics was largely deterministic. But when scientists began studying the quantum mechanics, they realized that indeterminism and chance play a role in our universe. Both classical physics and quantum mechanics are correct and work well within their own bailiwick, and continue to be taught to students. Similarly, Townes believes that growth of religious understanding will modify, but not make us abandon, our classic religious beliefs.

=== Death ===
Townes had steadily been active at the UCB campus, visiting and working regularly in the physics department or at the Space Sciences Laboratory past his 99th birthday and only a few months before his death. Townes' health began to decline, and he died on route to the hospital in Oakland, California, on January 27, 2015, at the age of 99. Reinhard Genzel, a professor of physics at Berkeley, said of Townes: "He was one of the most important experimental physicists of the last century. ... His strength was his curiosity and his unshakable optimism, based on his deep Christian spirituality."

== Recognition ==
=== Memberships ===
Year	Organization	Type	Ref.
1956	(United States) National Academy of Sciences	Member	
1957	(United States) American Academy of Arts and Sciences	Member	
1960	(United States) American Philosophical Society	Member	
1970	(United States) Optical Society of America	Honorary Member	
1976	(United Kingdom) Royal Society	Foreign Member	
1983	(Vatican City) Pontifical Academy of Sciences	Academician	

=== Awards ===
Year	Organization	Award	Citation	Ref.
1958	(United States) National Academy of Sciences	Comstock Prize in Physics	—	
1959	(United States) Institute of Radio Engineers	IRE Morris Liebmann Memorial Prize (Note: Shared with Nicolaas Bloembergen.)	"For fundamental and original contributions to the maser."	
1959	(United States) AAPT	Richtmyer Memorial Award	—	
1961	(United States) American Academy of Arts and Sciences	Rumford Prize	"For his development of the laser."	
1961	(United States) National Academy of Sciences	John J. Carty Award for the Advancement of Science	—	
1961	—	David Sarnoff Award	"For research in resonance physics leading to major advances in communication technology."	
1962	(United States) Franklin Institute	Stuart Ballantine Medal (Note: Shared with Arthur Schawlow.)	"For theoretical work on MASER operation."	
1963	(United Kingdom) Institute of Physics	Thomas Young Medal and Prize	—	
1964	(Sweden) Royal Swedish Academy of Sciences	Nobel Prize in Physics (Note: Shared with Nikolay Basov and Alexander Prokhorov.)	"For fundamental work in the field of quantum electronics, which has led to the construction of oscillators and amplifiers based on the maser-laser principle."	
1967	(United States) IEEE	IEEE Medal of Honor	"For his significant contributions in the field of quantum electronics which have led to the maser and the laser."	
1968	(United States) Optical Society of America	C.E.K. Mees Medal	—	
1969	(United States) American Academy of Achievement	Golden Plate Award	—	
1970	(Austria) Austrian Trade Association	Wilhelm Exner Medal	–	
1977	(United States) American Physical Society	Earle K. Plyler Prize	"For his contributions to the renaissance in optical spectroscopy using maser and laser techniques for obtaining precise and diverse information about numerous molecules; for his part in the initiation of microwave interstellar molecular spectroscopy and for his participation in the first detection of the spectral lines of ammonia and water molecules in outer space."	
1979	(Denmark) Danish Society of Engineers	Niels Bohr International Gold Medal	—	
1996	(United States) Optical Society of America	Frederic Ives Medal	"For five decades of major contributions to the field of optics, including research, education and administration, but especially for his inspiring creativity in optical physics, from quantum electronics to airborne infrared astronomy."	
1999	(India) Asiatic Society	Rabindranath Tagore Birth Centenary Plaque	—	
2000	(Russia) Russian Academy of Sciences	Lomonosov Gold Medal (Note: Shared with Andrey Gaponov-Grekhov.)	"For fundamental contributions to quantum electronics and microwave spectroscopy."	
2005	(United States) John Templeton Foundation	Templeton Prize	—	
2010	(United States) SPIE	SPIE Gold Medal	—	
2012	—	Golden Goose Award	—	
2012	(United States) ASME	Nancy DeLoye Fitzroy and Roland V. Fitzroy Medal	—	

=== National awards ===
Year	Head of state	Award	Citation	Ref.
1982	(United States) Ronald Reagan	National Medal of Science	"For fundamental contributions to the understanding of matter through its interaction with electromagnetic radiations and the application of this knowledge to the service of mankind, most notably in the invention of the maser and laser."	

== Selected publications ==
Townes work was published widely in books and peer-reviewed journal articles, including:

- Gordon, J.; Zeiger, H.; Townes, Charles (1955). "The Maser—New Type of Microwave Amplifier, Frequency Standard, and Spectrometer". Physical Review. 99 (4): 1264–1274. Bibcode:1955PhRv...99.1264G. doi:10.1103/PhysRev.99.1264.
- Shimoda, K.; Wang, T.; Townes, Charles (1956). "Further Aspects of the Theory of the Maser". Physical Review. 102 (5): 1308–1321. Bibcode:1956PhRv..102.1308S. doi:10.1103/PhysRev.102.1308.
- Schawlow, Arthur; Townes, Charles (1958). "Infrared and Optical Masers". Physical Review. 112 (6): 1940–1949. Bibcode:1958PhRv..112.1940S. doi:10.1103/PhysRev.112.1940.
- Townes, Charles (1999). How the Laser Happened: Adventures Of a Scientist. Oxford University Press. ISBN 978-0-19-512268-8.
- Townes, Charles; Schawlow, Arthur (1955). Microwave Spectroscopy. McGraw-Hill. ISBN 978-0-07-065095-4
- Townes, Charles H. (1995). Making Waves. Springer. ISBN 978-1-56396-381-0.
- Townes, Charles H. (November 11, 2004). "Making waves" (PDF). Nature. 432 (7014). doi:10.1038/432153a. ISSN 0028-0836. (requires subscription)
