= Francesco Svelto =

Italian electrical engineer

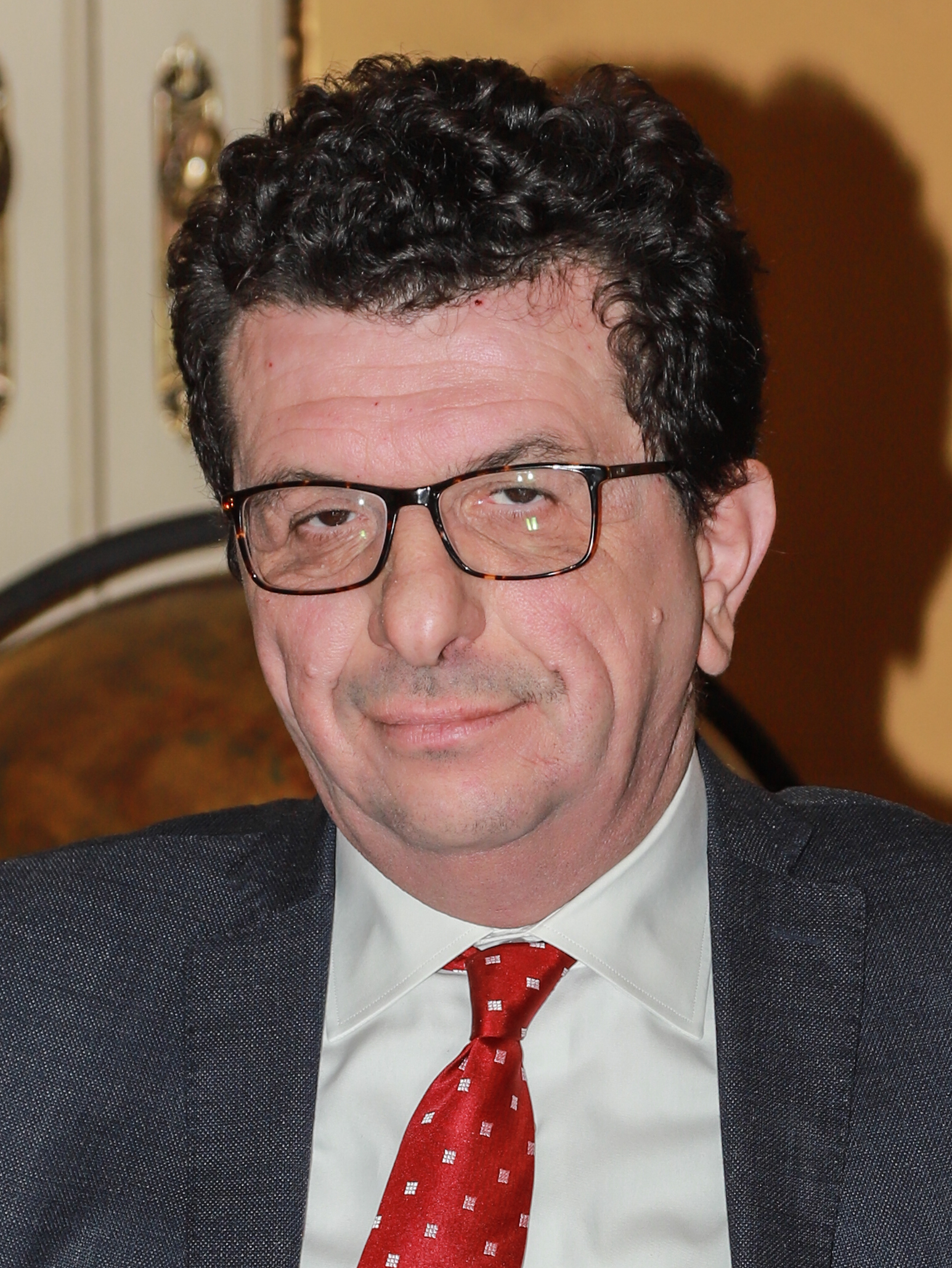
Francesco Svelto

Francesco Svelto (born 7 March 1966) is an electrical engineer from the University of Pavia in Pavia, Italy. He was named a Fellow of the Institute of Electrical and Electronics Engineers (IEEE) in 2013 for his contributions to the analysis and design of radio frequency circuits and systems.

On May 29, 2019, Prof. Svelto was elected Chancellor of the University of Pavia, starting his new position from October 2019. After the public announcement, Svelto gave a speech addressing his intention of foster internationalisation of the university and collaborations with industry.
