= Alexander Prokhorov =

Australian-born Soviet physicist (1916–2002)

- Александр Прохоров
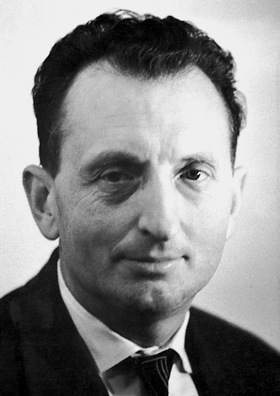
- Prokhorov in 1964
- Born: Alexander Michael Prochoroff; 11 July 1916; Atherton, Queensland, Australia
- Died: 8 January 2002 (aged 85); Moscow, Russia
- Resting place: Novodevichy Cemetery, Moscow
- Known for: Lasers and masers
- Spouse: Galina Shelepina (m. 1941)
- Children: 1
- Awards: Nobel Prize in Physics (1964); Lomonosov Gold Medal (1987); Frederic Ives Medal (2000); Demidov Prize (2001)

Academic background
- Education: Cand. Sc., Lebedev Physical Institute; Dr. Sc., Lebedev Physical Institute
- Thesis: Theory of Stabilization of Frequency of a Tube Oscillator in the Theory of a Small Parameter (1946)

Academic work
- Discipline: Optics
- Sub-discipline: Laser science
- Institutions: Lebedev Physical Institute; Moscow State University; Moscow Institute of Physics and Technology
- Doctoral students: Nikolay Basov

Alexander Mikhailovich Prokhorov (born Alexander Michael Prochoroff; Russian: Александр Михайлович Прохоров; 11 July 1916 – 8 January 2002) was an Australian-born Soviet physicist and researcher whose work focused on quantum electronics. His most famous and well-known works were on optics and electromagnetic research. He was jointly awarded the Nobel Prize in Physics in 1964 with Charles Hard Townes and Nikolay Basov for his fundamental work that led to the development of the laser and the maser.

== Early life ==
Alexander Michael Prochoroff was born on 11 July 1916 in Atherton, Australia, to Russian parents who had emigrated from Russia to escape repression by the Tsarist regime. As a child, he attended Butchers Creek State School. The family returned to Russia in 1923, after the culmination of the October Revolution and the Russian Civil War.

In 1934, Prokhorov entered the Saint Petersburg State University to study physics. He was a member of the Komsomol from 1930 to 1944, the youth wing of the CPSU. Prokhorov graduated with honors in 1939 and moved to Moscow to work at the Lebedev Physical Institute, in the oscillations laboratory headed by academician N. D. Papaleksi. His research there was devoted to propagation of radio waves in the ionosphere.

At the onset of World War II, in June 1941, he joined the Red Army. Prokhorov fought in the infantry, was wounded twice in battles, and was awarded three medals, including the Medal For Courage in 1946. He was demobilized in 1944, a year before the end of WWII and eventual victory of the Allies.

Prokhorov returned to the Lebedev Institute where, in 1946, he defended his Candidate of Sciences thesis titled Theory of Stabilization of Frequency of a Tube Oscillator in the Theory of a Small Parameter.

== Research ==
In 1947, Prokhorov started working on coherent radiation emitted by electrons orbiting in a cyclic particle accelerator called a synchrotron. He demonstrated that the emission is mostly concentrated in the microwave spectral range. His results became the basis of his Doctor of Sciences thesis titled Coherent Radiation of Electrons in the Synchrotron Accelerator, defended in 1951. By 1950, Prokhorov was assistant chief of the oscillation laboratory. Around that time, he formed a group of young scientists to work on radiospectroscopy of molecular rotations and vibrations, and later on quantum electronics. The group focused on a special class of molecules which have three (non-degenerate) moments of inertia. The research was conducted both on experiment and theory. In 1954, Prokhorov became head of the laboratory. Together with Nikolay Basov he developed theoretical grounds for creation of a molecular oscillator and constructed such a device based on ammonia. They also proposed a method for the production of population inversion using inhomogeneous electric and magnetic fields. Their results were first presented at a national conference in 1952, but not published until 1954–1955.

In 1955, Prokhorov started his research in the field of electron paramagnetic resonance (EPR). He focused on relaxation times of ions of the iron group elements in a lattice of aluminium oxide, but also investigated other, "non-optical", topics, such as magnetic phase transitions in DPPH. In 1957, while studying ruby, a chromium-doped variation of aluminium oxide, he came upon the idea of using this material as an active medium of a laser. As a new type of laser resonator, he proposed, in 1958, an "open type" cavity design, which is widely used today. In 1963, together with A. S. Selivanenko, he suggested a laser using two-quantum transitions. For his pioneering work on lasers and masers, in 1964, he received the Nobel Prize in Physics shared with Nikolay Basov and Charles Hard Townes.

== Posts and awards ==
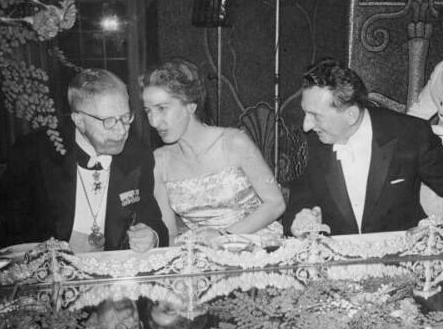
Prokhorov with King Gustaf VI Adolf and wife of Townes at the Nobel Prize banquet in 1964

In 1959, Prokhorov became a professor at Moscow State University – the most prestigious university in the Soviet Union; the same year, he was awarded the Lenin Prize. In 1960, he became a member of the Russian Academy of Sciences and elected Academician in 1966. In 1967, he was awarded his first Order of Lenin (he received five of them during life, in 1967, 1969, 1975, 1981 and 1986). In 1968, he became vice-director of the Lebedev Institute and in 1971 took the position of Head of Laboratory of another prestigious Soviet institution, the Moscow Institute of Physics and Technology. In the same year, he was elected a member of the American Academy of Arts and Sciences. In 1983 he was elected a Member of the German Academy of Sciences Leopoldina. Between 1982 and 1998, Prokhorov served as acting director of the General Physics Institute of the Russian Academy of Sciences, and after 1998 as honorary director. After his death in 2002, the institute was renamed the A. M. Prokhorov General Physics Institute of the Russian Academy of Sciences. Prokhorov was a Member and one of the Honorary Presidents of the International Academy of Science, Munich and supported 1993 the foundation and development of the Russian Section of International Academy of Science, Moscow.

In 1969, Prokhorov became a Hero of Socialist Labour, the highest degree of distinction in the Soviet Union for achievements in national economy and culture. He received the second such award in 1986. Starting in 1969, he was the chief editor of the Great Soviet Encyclopedia. He was awarded the Frederic Ives Medal, the highest distinction of the Optical Society of America (OSA), in 2000 and became an Honorary OSA Member in 2001. The same year, he was awarded the Demidov Prize by the government of the Russian Federation.

He died on 8 January 2002 at Moscow and was buried at Novodevichy Cemetery in Moscow.

== Politics ==
Prokhorov became a member of the Communist Party of the Soviet Union in 1950. In 1983, together with three other academicians – Andrey Tychonoff, Anatoly Dorodnitsyn and Georgy Skryabin – he signed the famous open letter called "when they lose honor and conscience" (Когда теряют честь и совесть), denouncing Andrey Sakharov's article in the Foreign Affairs.

== Family ==
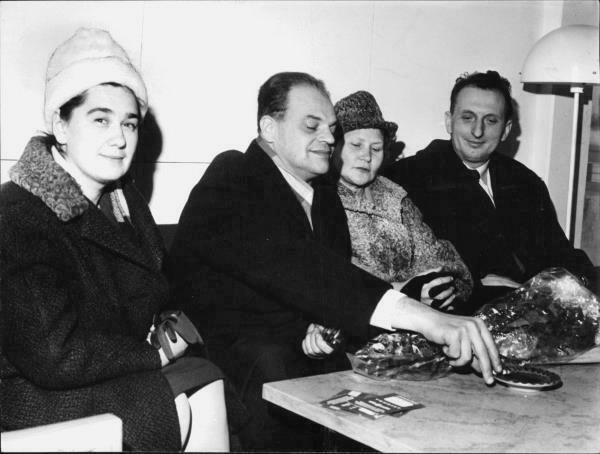
Basov and Prokhorov with their wives in Stockholm in 1964

Both of Prokhorov's parents died during World War II. Prokhorov married geographer Galina Shelepina in 1941, and they had a son, Kiril, born in 1945. Following his father, Kiril Prokhorov became a physicist in the field of optics and is currently leading a laser-related laboratory at the A. M. Prokhorov General Physics Institute.

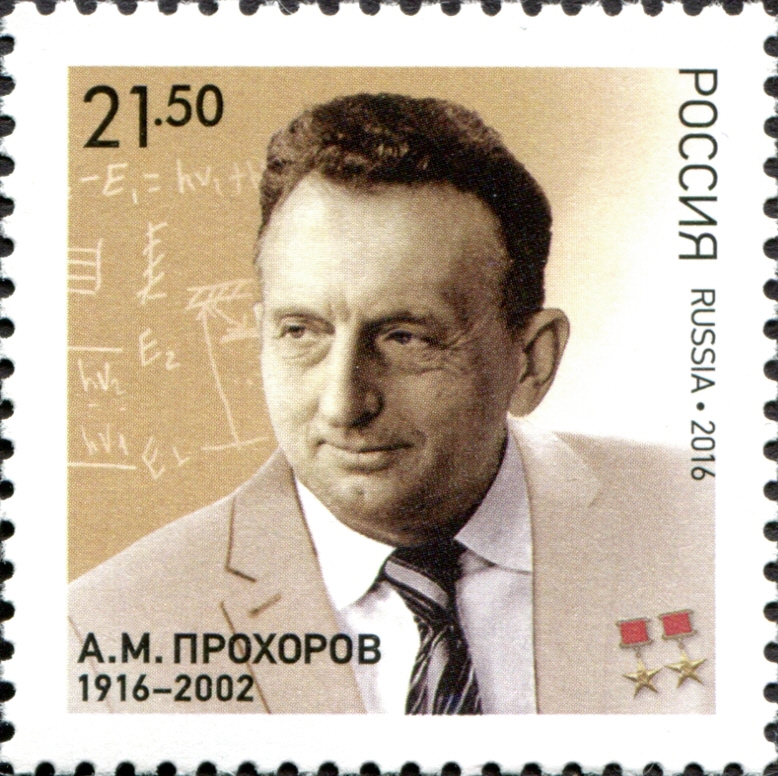
Alexander Prokhorov on 2016 postage stamp of Russia

== Honours and awards ==
The list below includes awards and honors from the Soviet Union, Russian federation, foreign research councils and international associations.

- Mandelstam Prize (1948)
- Lenin Prize (1959)
- Five Orders of Lenin (1967, 1969, 1975, 1981 and 1986)
- Order of the Patriotic War, 1st class (1985)
- Nobel Prize in Physics in 1964, alongside Nikolay Basov and Charles H. Townes
- Hero of Socialist Labour, twice (1969, 1986)
- Medal For Courage
- USSR State Prize (1980)
- Order of Merit for the Fatherland, 2nd class (1996)
- State Prize of the Russian Federation (1998)
- Medal Frederick Ayvesa (2000)
- Demidov Prize (2001)
- Lomonosov Gold Medal (Moscow State University, 1987)
- Award of the Council of Ministers
- State Prize of the Russian Federation in science and technology (2003, posthumously) for the development of scientific and technological foundations of metrological support of measurements of length in the microwave and nanometer ranges and their application in microelectronics and nanotechnology
- Foreign Member of the Czechoslovak Academy of Sciences (1982)
- Jubilee Medal "In Commemoration of the 100th Anniversary since the Birth of Vladimir Il'ich Lenin"
- Medal "For the Victory over Germany in the Great Patriotic War 1941–1945"
- Jubilee Medal "Twenty Years of Victory in the Great Patriotic War 1941-1945"
- Jubilee Medal "Thirty Years of Victory in the Great Patriotic War 1941-1945"
- Jubilee Medal "Forty Years of Victory in the Great Patriotic War 1941-1945"
- Medal "For Valiant Labour in the Great Patriotic War 1941-1945"
- Medal "Veteran of Labour"
- Elected member of the American Academy of Arts and Sciences
- Jubilee Medal "50 Years of the Armed Forces of the USSR"
- Medal "In Commemoration of the 800th Anniversary of Moscow"
- Medal "In Commemoration of the 850th Anniversary of Moscow"
- Honorary membership of the Optical Society of America

== Books ==
- A. M. Prokhorov (Editor in Chief), J. M. Buzzi, P. Sprangle, K. Wille. Coherent Radiation Generation and Particle Acceleration, 1992, ISBN 0-88318-926-7. Research Trends in Physics series published by the American Institute of Physics Press (presently Springer, New York)
- V. Stefan and A. M. Prokhorov (Editors) Diamond Science and Technology Vol 1: Laser Diamond Interaction. Plasma Diamond Reactors (Stefan University Press Series on Frontiers in Science and Technology) 1999 ISBN 1-889545-23-6.
- V. Stefan and A. M. Prokhorov (Editors). Diamond Science and Technology Vol 2 (Stefan University Press Series on Frontiers in Science and Technology) 1999 ISBN 1-889545-24-4.
