= Nikolay Basov =

Soviet physicist (1922–2001)

- Николай Басов
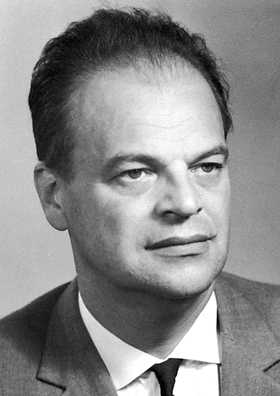
- Basov in 1964
- Born: Nikolay Gennadiyevich Basov; 14 December 1922; Usman, Tambov Governorate, Russian SFSR
- Died: 1 July 2001 (aged 78); Moscow, Russia
- Resting place: Novodevichy Cemetery, Moscow
- Education: Moscow Engineering Physics Institute
- Known for: Invention of lasers and masers
- Spouse: Ksenia Tikhonovna Basova
- Children: Dimitri Basov (physics professor at Columbia University)
- Awards: Nobel Prize in Physics (1964); Kalinga Prize (1986); Lomonosov Gold Medal (1989); Edward Teller Award1991)
- Scientific career
- Fields: Physics
- Workplaces: Lebedev Physical Institute

Nikolay Gennadiyevich Basov (Russian: Николай Геннадиевич Басов; 14 December 1922 – 1 July 2001) was a Soviet physicist and educator. For his fundamental work in the field of quantum electronics that led to the development of laser and maser, Basov shared the 1964 Nobel Prize in Physics with Alexander Prokhorov and Charles Hard Townes.

== Early life and education ==
Nikolay Gennadiyevich Basov was born on 14 December 1922 in Usman, Russia, the son of Gennady Fedorovich Basov and Zinaida Andreevna Molchanova. Basov finished high school in 1941 in Voronezh, and was later called for military service at the Kuibyshev Military Medical Academy. In 1943, he left the academy and served in the Red Army participating in the Second World War with the 1st Ukrainian Front.

In 1945, Basov entered the Moscow Engineering Physics Institute (MEPhI). In 1950, he began his postgraduate studies at the MEPhI, although he worked on his Candidate of Sciences thesis at the Lebedev Physical Institute (LPI)—under the supervision of Mikhail Leontovich and Alexander Prokhorov—receiving his degree in 1953. Basov defended his Doctor of Sciences thesis, A Molecular Oscillator, in 1956.

In 1950, Basov married Ksenia Tikhonovna, who was also a physicist. They had two sons, Gennady (born 1954) and Dmitry (born 1963).

== Career and research ==
Basov was Director of the LPI from 1973 to 1988. He was elected a corresponding member of the USSR Academy of Sciences (Russian Academy of Sciences since 1991) in 1962 and Full Member of the Academy in 1966. In 1967, he was elected a Member of the Presidium of the Academy (1967—1990), and since 1990 he was the councillor of the Presidium of the USSR Academy of Sciences. In 1971 he was elected a Member of the German Academy of Sciences Leopoldina. He was Honorary President and Member of the International Academy of Science, Munich. He was the head of the laboratory of quantum radiophysics at the LPI until his death in 2001.

In the early 1950s Basov and Prokhorov developed theoretical grounds for creation of a molecular oscillator and constructed such an oscillator based on ammonia. Later this oscillator became known as maser. They also proposed a method for the production of population inversion using inhomogeneous electric and magnetic fields. Their results were presented at a national conference in 1952 and published in 1954. Basov then proceeded to the development of laser, an analogous generator of coherent light. In 1955 he designed a three-level laser, and in 1959 suggested constructing a semiconductor laser, which he built with collaborators in 1963. Basov with co-workers proposed Disk laser in 1966 and realized experimentally the thin disk active mirror semiconductor lasers. He developed with colleaguaes the first nonlinear theory of coherent addition of laser sets. N.G.Basov encouraged the researchers in nonlinear optics in Lebedev Institute who discovered the optical phase conjugation. Together with Lebedev Institute researchers he realized the robust method of the phase-locking of laser arrays via optical phase conjugation in Stimulated Brillouin scattering.

Basov's contributions to the development of the laser and maser, which won him the Nobel Prize in 1964, also led to new missile defense initiatives.

Basov died on 1 July 2001 in Moscow at the age of 78, and was buried in Novodevichy Cemetery.

== Politics ==
He entered politics in 1951 and became a member of parliament (the Soviet of the Union of the Supreme Soviet) in 1974. Following U.S. President Ronald Reagan's speech on SDI in 1983, Basov signed a letter along with other Soviet scientists condemning the initiative, which was published in the New York Times. In 1985 he declared the Soviet Union was capable of matching SDI proposals made by the U.S.

== Awards ==
Year	Organization	Award	Citation	Ref.
1964	(Sweden) Royal Swedish Academy of Sciences	Nobel Prize in Physics (Note: Shared with Alexander Prokhorov and Charles Townes.)	"For fundamental work in the field of quantum electronics, which has led to the construction of oscillators and amplifiers based on the maser-laser principle."	
1986	(France) UNESCO	Kalinga Prize (Note: Shared with David Suzuki.)	"For his work to interpret science and technology to the public, notably through his many publications aimed at informing the public on science."	
1989	Academy of Sciences of the Soviet Union	Lomonosov Gold Medal (Note: Shared with Hans Bethe.)	"For outstanding achievements in the field of physics."	
1991	(United States) American Nuclear Society	Edward Teller Award (Note: Shared with Heinrich Hora, John Nuckolls, and Chiyoe Yamanaka.)	—	

== Books ==
- N. G. Basov, K. A. Brueckner (Editor-in-Chief), S. W. Haan, C. Yamanaka. Inertial Confinement Fusion, 1992, Research Trends in Physics Series published by the American Institute of Physics Press (presently Springer, New York). ISBN 0-88318-925-9.
- V. Stefan and N. G. Basov (Editors). Semiconductor Science and Technology, Volume 1. Semiconductor Lasers. (Stefan University Press Series on Frontiers in Science and Technology) (Paperback), 1999. ISBN 1-889545-11-2.
- V. Stefan and N. G. Basov (Editors). Semiconductor Science and Technology, Volume 2: Quantum Dots and Quantum Wells. (Stefan University Press Series on Frontiers in Science and Technology) (Paperback), 1999. ISBN 1-889545-12-0.

== See also ==
- Excimer laser
- Maser
- Alexander Prokhorov
- Lebedev Institute of Physics
- Disk laser
- Nonlinear optics
- Coherent addition
- Michelson interferometer
