= Orazio Svelto =

Italian physicist (1936–2026)

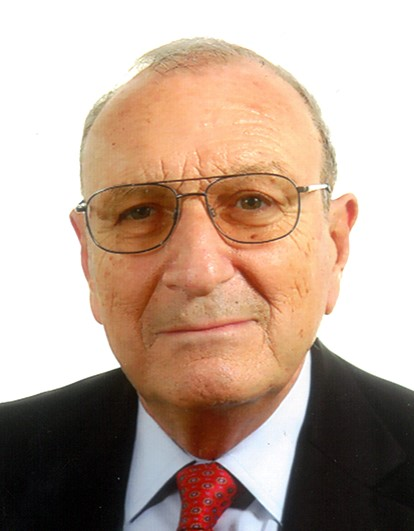
- Born: 21 February 1936; Maglie, Italy
- Died: 10 January 2026 (aged 89); Milan, Italy
- Education: Degree in Nuclear Engineering
- Awards: G. Borgia Foundation Prize, Accademia Nazionale dei Lincei (1991); Quantum Electronics Prize, European Physical Society (1998); ITALGAS Prize, Italgas (2000); Gold Medal, The Presidency of the Republic (2005); C. H. Townes Medal, Optica (2006); Julius Springer Prize, Springer (2011)
- Scientific career
- Institutions: Politecnico di Milano; Istituto di Fotonica e Nanotecnologie CNR

Orazio Svelto (21 February 1936 – 10 January 2026) was an Italian physicist, academic and author. He was an Emeritus Professor of Physics at Politecnico di Milano.

Svelto explored a range of topics in Laser Physics and Photonics over the years, notably areas like ultrashort-pulse generation, laser resonator physics, and solid-state lasers. His notable contributions to the field also include the invention of the hollow fiber (now often referred to as the Hollow Capillary Fiber, HCF) compressor of optical pulses. His scholarly publications include scientific papers published in journals, such as Phys Rev. Letters, Applied Physics Letters, and Optics Letters. Additionally, he has authored and co-authored books, including Problems in Laser Physics and Principles of Lasers, which has progressed to its fifth edition and has been translated into multiple languages.

Svelto served as a Vice-President of the Italian Association for Electronics and as a member of the Scientific Advisory Board of the Max Planck Institute for the Science of Light. Moreover, he has received awards, including the Quantum Electronics Prize, the Italgas Prize, the Gold Medal of the President of the Italian Republic for deserving citizens in Science, Culture, and Art, the Charles Hard Townes Medal, and the Julius Springer Prize for Applied Physics.

== Background ==
Svelto earned a degree in Nuclear Engineering from Politecnico di Milano in 1960. From 1961 to 1963, he was a Research Associate at the Microwave Laboratory at Stanford University, supported by a fellowship from the Italian National Research Council (CNR). Between 1963 and 1976, he held various positions at CNR, including Researcher, Head of Research, and Research Director. In 1966, he received the "Libera Docenza" degree in Quantum Electronics, which was reaffirmed in 1972. From 1976 to 2010, he was a Full Professor of Quantum Electronics and Physics of Matter at Politecnico di Milano and has held the title of Emeritus Professor since 2010. Moreover, in 1976, he also established the Center for Quantum Electronics and Electronics Instrumentation, which he directed until 2000 when it merged with the Institute for Photonics and Nanotechnologies at CNR.

Svelto died in Milan on 10 January 2026, at the age of 89.

== Works ==
In 1988, Svelto and his coworkers invented the super-Gaussian mirrors for solid-state laser with unstable resonators. Another notable contribution to the field is the invention and development, in 1991, of an efficient diode-pumped continuous-wave Er:Yb:glass laser. Later in 1996, in a collaborative study, he and his coworkers invented an optical compression technique, generating 10 fs pulses with 240 μJ energy via hollow-core waveguide broadening and prism-based compression. By advancing this, he compressed high-energy laser pulses below 5 fs using spectral broadening in a hollow fiber and dispersion compensation. In the same year, he achieved multigigawatt sub-5-fs pulse generation using a novel high-energy compression system, optimizing spectral broadening and dispersion control for unprecedented pulse shortening to 4.5 fs.

Svelto authored and co-authored several books, including Principles of Lasers, which provides an overview of laser physics, technology, behavior, and applications. In its fourth edition, the book was reviewed in the journal Sensor Review, where it was described as "well presented and clearly explained." The fifth edition of Principles of Lasers also aimed to provide an explanation of laser behavior, covering its principles, schemes, and technologies, along with practical examples. Moreover, his other multi-edition book, Problems in Laser Physics, addressed laser physics problems, including radiation interaction, wave propagation, pumping, laser behavior, and beam transformation.

== Awards and honors ==
- 1990 – Elected Member, Accademia Nazionale delle Scienze detta dei XL
- 1991 – G. Borgia Foundation Prize, Accademia Nazionale dei Lincei
- 1993 – Elected Fellow, Institute of Electrical and Electronics Engineers
- 1998 – Quantum Electronics Prize, European Physical Society
- 1999 – Sergio Panizza, Italian Physical Society
- 1999 – Elected Fellow, Optical Society of America (OSA)
- 2000 – ITALGAS Prize, Italgas
- 2004 – Elected Member, Accademia Nazionale dei Lincei
- 2005 – Gold medal, The Presidency of the Republic
- 2006 – Charles Hard Townes Medal, Optica, with the following motivation: "For pioneering works on ultrashort laser pulses and solid state lasers and for the invention of the hollow-fiber compressor leading to advances in extreme nonlinear optics and attosecond science"
- 2006–2012 – Member of the Scientific Advisory Board, Max Planck Institute for the Science of Light (Erlangen, Germany)
- 2011 – Julius Springer Prize, Springer, with the following motivation: "For his pioneering, long lasting, and innovative work in the fields of lasers and optics. He is an internationally renowned laser and photonics scientist and one of the worldwide leaders of the scientific community in this field"

== Bibliography ==
=== Books ===
- Principles of Lasers (2010) ISBN 9781441913029
- Ultrafast Processes in Spectroscopy (2012) ISBN 9781461558972
- Problems in Laser Physics (2012) ISBN 9781461513735

=== Selected articles ===
- De Silvestri, S.; Laporta, P.; Magni, V.; Svelto, O. (1988). "Solid-state laser unstable resonators with tapered reflectivity mirrors: the super-Gaussian approach". IEEE Journal of Quantum Electronics. 24 (6): 1172–1177. Bibcode:1988IJQE...24.1172D. doi:10.1109/3.240.
- Laporta, P.; De Silvestri, S.; Magni, V.; Svelto, O. (1991). "Diode-pumped cw bulk Er: Yb: glass laser". Optics Letters. 16 (24): 1952–1954. Bibcode:1991OptL...16.1952L. doi:10.1364/OL.16.001952. PMID 19784192.
- Nisoli, M.; De Silvestri, S.; Svelto, O. (1996). "Generation of high energy 10 fs pulses by a new pulse compression technique". Applied Physics Letters. 68 (20): 2793–2795. Bibcode:1996ApPhL..68.2793N. doi:10.1063/1.116609.
- Nisoli, M.; De Silvestri, S.; Svelto, O.; Szipöcs, R.; Ferencz, K.; Spielmann, C.; Krausz, F. (1997). "Compression of high-energy laser pulses below 5 fs". Optics Letters. 22 (8): 522–524. Bibcode:1997OptL...22..522N. doi:10.1364/OL.22.000522. PMID 18183254.
- Nisoli, M.; Stagira, S.; De Silvestri, S.; Svelto, O.; Sartania, S.; Cheng, Z.; Krausz, F. (1997). "A novel-high energy pulse compression system: generation of multigigawatt sub-5-fs pulses". Applied Physics B: Lasers & Optics. 65 (2): 189–196. Bibcode:1997ApPhB..65..189N. doi:10.1007/s003400050263.
