= Lumonics =

Defunct Canadian company

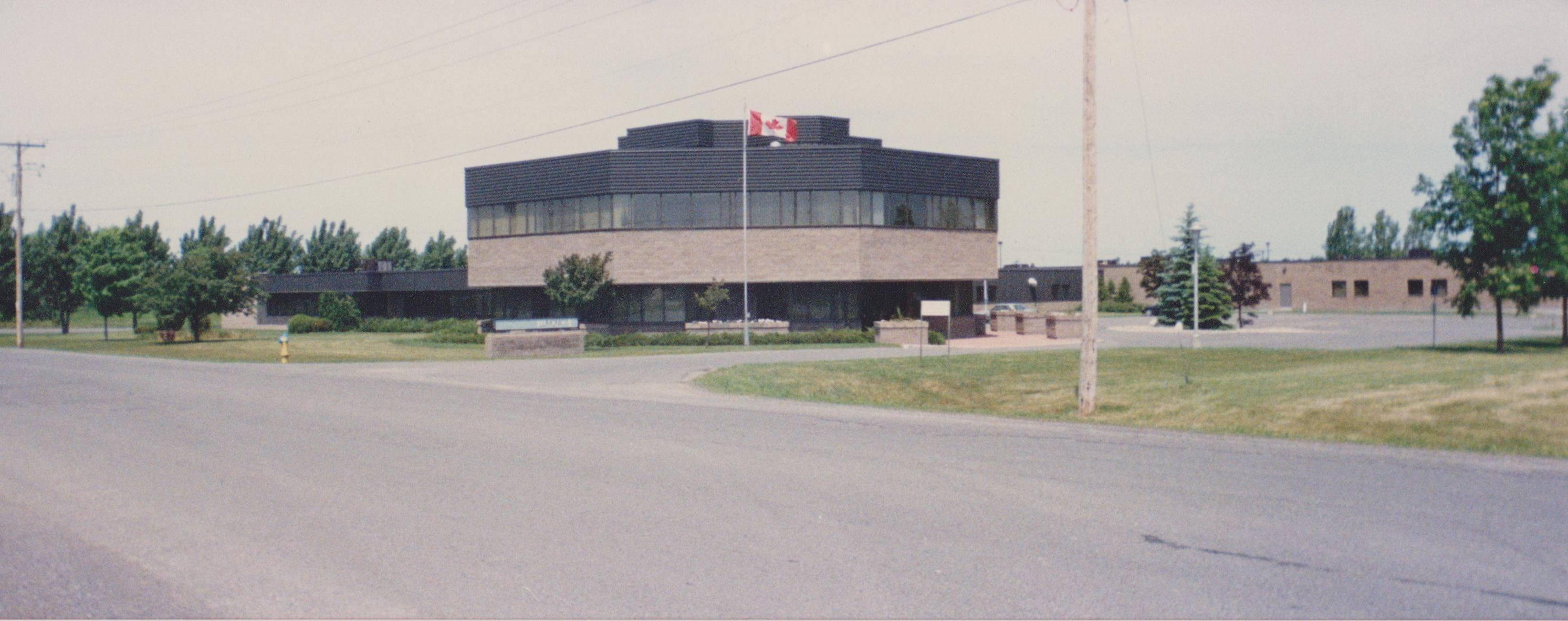
- Headquarters in Kanata North Business Park
- Type: Public
- Industry: Electronics, Semiconductor, Laser
- Founded: 1970
- Founder: Alan Buchanan, Gordon Mauchel, Alan Crawford
- Defunct: 2002
- Fate: Absorbed
- Headquarters: Kanata North Business Park
- Key people: Robert Atkinson, Scott Nix
- Products: on the Wayback Machine
- Revenue: $374 million US (2000)
- Number of employees: 1,550 (2000)
- Website: www.lumonics.com (on the Wayback Machine)

Lumonics was a global laser manufacturing company based in the Kanata North Business Park region of Ottawa.

Founded in 1970, it was the first venture capital (VC) financed high tech company of the ones that based themselves there, thus clearing the path (started by Computing Devices from nearby Bells Corners back in 1948) for the subsequent VC and start-up fueled growth that led to the region later becoming known as “Silicon Valley North”.

With an average sales growth of almost 89% per year over its first decade, in 1980 the company went public. After its acquisition of JK Lasers in 1982, it became “the third largest laser company in the world”. Following a period of private ownership by the Japanese firm Sumitomo Heavy Industries Ltd. starting in 1989, it once again went public in 1995 and went on to merge with Massachusetts-based General Scanning Inc. in 1998/99, to become GSI Lumonics, “the largest producer of laser-based manufacturing equipment in the world".

With most of its employees now in the US, despite subsequent growth from the dot-com boom, the Canadian workforce was scaled back down again after the 2001 recession and, in 2002, the original Canadian headquarters was finally “boarded up” and control shifted to the U.S. operations.

The company's name was changed to GSI Group in 2005, then finally Novanta, its current name, in 2016.

The original Impact, LaserMark, and excimer laser product lines of Lumonics were sold by GSI Group in 2008/2009 to LightMachinery in the Nepean region of Ottawa, many of whose employees originally started out at Lumonics in Kanata.

== Corporate history ==
=== Founding And Initial Expansion ===
As paraphrased by The Globe and Mail, one day “over cocktails”, the wives of “fellow neighbors and weekend pilots”, Al Buchanan and Gord Mauchel, “wondered aloud why the two did not quit their jobs and start their own business. It sounded like a good idea".

Early in 1970, Buchanan, Director of Engineering at Leigh Instruments at the time (and formerly Vice President of Computing Devices before that), and Mauchel, president of Spectra Research, together with a third silent partner, Allan Crawford, president of Allan Crawford Associates of Toronto, started to do just that, co-founding a yet to be incorporated company under the initial name of “Lumonix Limited".

That summer the tentative company submitted, and successfully won, an application for the right to manufacture and sell Transversely Excited Atmospheric (TEA) gas lasers invented at the Government's Defence Research Establishment in Val-Cartier, Quebec.

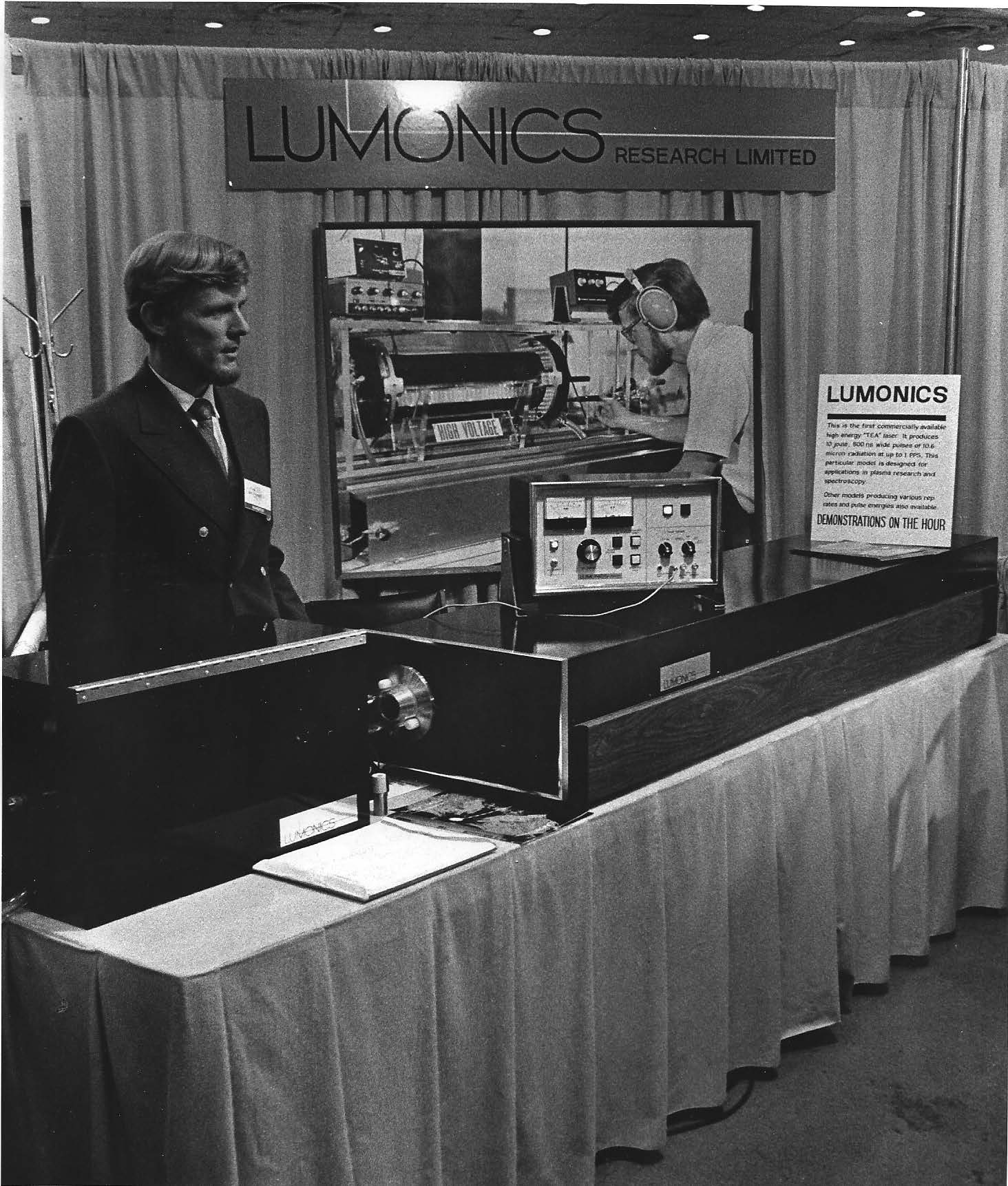
John Nilson in Lumonics booth at a New York laser conference showing the first commercially available high energy TEA laser

With the success of that in hand, the three co-founders officially incorporated the company in November of that year, with Buchanan as president, and began operations at 1755 Woodward Dr. in Ottawa in January of the following year, 1971. The spelling of the company's name was changed to "Lumonics" to avoid confusion with another company named "Lumonix".

In April, Imperial College London PHD graduate and scientist, John Nilson, was hired as its first and chief scientist. By September, Nilson was already exhibiting the industry's first commercially available high energy TEA laser at a conference in New York and only a few years later, he was involved in the design, specification, assembly and testing of TEA amplifiers for Lawrence Livermore Laboratory's 1975 project "Valkyrie, a CO_{2} system for Laser Fusion Experiments". "The CO_{2} laser [was] of interest to the laser fusion effort because of its high power output, high efficiency, and simplicity."

The following year, in 1972, Robert Atkinson (formerly part of Corporate Finance and Acquisitions at Leigh Instruments) came on full time as vice president and Treasurer, along with Mauchel as Vice President of Marketing who had prior to that only been part time.

In exchange for 25% of the company, Lumonics received additional financing in 1973 from the venture capital arm of Maclaren Power and Paper, the first venture investment made by the only local venture capital operation in the region from then through the 1980s (over which time it was acquired by Noranda Inc. in 1979 and spun off as Noranda Enterprises in 1983).

With the additional financing in hand, in 1974, the company built and moved to a new 14,500 square foot company-owned facility on a five-acre property at 105 Schneider Road in Kanata.

1976 “marked” the introduction of the company's first industrial product, Lasermark, capable of marking information on products (up to over 70,000 per hour on an assembly line) using a high-energy laser pulse through a mask and focusing it on a surface, without any risk of smearing that could otherwise result from existing ink-based processes at the time. Within only two to three years, the product would grow to become over 50% of the company's revenue.

In 1977, Lumonics developed and introduced the excimer laser, which like the TEA laser emits very short intense pulses of light, but instead produces output in the ultraviolet, rather than infrared, portion of the light spectrum. This opened up whole new areas for potential research and applications.

From 1978 to 1979, the Kanata plant was expanded with new 10,000 and 25,000 square foot facilities.

=== IPO ===
Having gone from revenues of $35,707 CAD in 1971 to $5,863,729 CAD eight years later in 1979, an average growth rate of almost 89% per year, in June 1980, the company changed its name from “Lumonics Research Limited” to “Lumonics Inc”, issued 800,000 shares of common stock for public sale in September, and obtained a listing on the Toronto Stock Exchange in October.

The following year, a new 7,800 square foot subsidiary plant, Lumonics Corporation, was established in Phoenix, Arizona “to become the centre of [the company's] industrial laser sales, service and customer engineering activities", and Robert Atkinson took over as president of the main company, with Buchanan becoming chairman and CEO.

=== Acquisitions and Turnover ===
Amidst a contracting economy at the time, in 1982, after many exploratory discussions and six months of intensive negotiations, Lumonics acquired Rugby England based JK Lasers Limited, comparably successful manufacturers of pulsed-based lasers whose synergies were that their products (solid state based lasers) were compatible, but not competitive, with those of Lumonics (gas based lasers) and sold to markets in Europe, rather than in North America. Both companies had a major focus on industrial automation, but JK's types of lasers also showed future promise for medical applications. As a result of the acquisition, Lumonics became “the world's third largest company specializing in laser products".

After another $10 million share issue to institutional investors in January 1983, a subsequent 2 for 1 stock split, and a 250% increase in orders at the JK subsidiary, construction was begun on a new 50,000 square foot plant there.

In March of the following year, Laser Identification Systems, which had just commenced operations in a new 23,000 square foot facility in Camarillo California, was officially adopted into the Lumonics Group of companies to handle the expanding market for marking and engraving. “Since commencing operations in 1979, [it had] established world dominance in computer-controlled laser systems used for marking silicon wafers produced by the rapidly expanding semiconductor industry".

In 1985 the new Camarillo subsidiary was renamed Lumonics Marking Corp (LMC) and the JK Laser subsidiary was renamed Lumonics Ltd.

Back in August 1983, the initial promise of medical applications for JK's types of lasers had appeared to start showing fruition when Lumonics signed an agreement with an American distributor, Medical Lasers Inc, that called for Lumonics "to develop a complete solid state laser system for ophthalmological surgery and to deliver quantities of such systems to the distributor in 1984 and 1985 valued at $9.4 million US". But delivering the full quantity required FDA approval which ultimately turned out to be such a costly legal affair that in 1985, the company finally abandoned the effort and "took a heart-breaking $3.1 million write-down in the area of ophthalmic surgical lasers that reduced 1985 profits to $2.7 million", with Mauchel commenting on the endeavour: "There are certainly some lessons for us to learn after the write-off. But management must take a few calculated risks along the way. If they don't, then they don't belong in the high-tech business."

After 14 years at the helm, in January 1985, Buchanan resigned from the company, with Mauchel succeeding him as chairman of the board. Following an $8.4 million acquisition of Photon Sources Inc. of Livonia, Michigan by the company in December of that year (as the subsidiary, Lumonics Material Processing Corp. or LMPC), in a surprise move the following March, Mauchel announced that he too would retire in September 1986, in turn handing over the reins to Atkinson, who added the third role of chairman to his existing ones as president and CEO, until a new president, Hugh MacDiarmid, could be found and finally was appointed in March 1987.

In 1986, due to "the very disappointing financial results of [the] most recently acquired Photon Sources Inc", together with the overall effects of "a slow U.S. economy and depressed conditions in the semiconductor/electronics industry", Lumonics reported its first loss since 1971.

=== Foreign Takeover And Political Controversy ===
Following a deal with Sumitomo Heavy Industries in the spring of 1988, enabling the company to enter the Japanese market in exchange for yielding exclusive distribution rights there for certain products, Lumonics ultimately agreed to an $80 million private takeover by the Japanese conglomerate in May 1989. Given the need for government approval (in accordance with the Investment Canada Act), much discussion occurred over the lead up, regarding the foreign takeover and ownership of companies in Canada, that ultimately reached a record number by the end of the year, triggering even greater concerns amongst critics over foreign control of the Canadian economy as a whole.

"I just sit here and watch this country being sold off piece by piece," Ontario Premier David Peterson said. "It's Lumonics, it's Connaught - and there it goes. What controls have we got left in our own country?", he continued, after it was announced that Connaught BioSciences Inc. of Toronto, the world's second-largest manufacturer of vaccines at the time, was also to be sold to a foreign bidder.

In contrast, Canadian Prime Minister Brian Mulroney said he would like all Canadian companies to be owned by Canadians but it doesn't work that way. "I'm looking for more research and development in Canada and I don't really much care in terms of where the money comes from for that research. Whether it comes from around the world, or it comes from the Caisse Populaire, fine, but we have to be committing a greater percentage of our national wealth to research and development."

=== Second Public Offering, Final Merger, and Absorption ===
After a six-year hiatus, Lumonics returned to the public markets in 1995 when Sumitomo offered back up a 40% stake in the company on the TSE. Scott Nix, formerly VP of the US subsidiary, was promoted to the newly created position of president and COO at the end of the year and eventually Sumitomo gave up its majority stake in another offering in 1997 (though continued to remain a significant shareholder until its bankruptcy in 2010).

The money raised from the resulting share issue, combined with the company's cash reserves, gave it what many analysts considered "a formidable takeover kitty", with much speculation following as to who the target might be.

In 1998, the company announced it would merge with Watertown Massachusetts based General Scanning Inc., to become GSI Lumonics, “the largest producer of laser-based manufacturing equipment in the world".

With the two companies having “very little competitive overlap, but operat[ing] in similar markets with complementary technologies, the merger was successfully completed on March 22, 1999", and the new company was listed on both the TSE and Nasdaq stock exchanges.

But though "billed as a merger of equals” under the terms of the agreement, with only 200 of the 1800 employee global workforce in the Ottawa region following the merger, the company's "operational heart" was now in the US.

Leading up to the peak of the dot-com boom in 2000, the number of employees grew back to as high as 400 of a total of 1550, the stock was the top performer in the TSE 300 for the first 6–7 months, and revenue for the year peaked at $374 million US (or over $555 million Canadian) - on paper elevating GSI Lumonics to the fourth largest high tech company in the Ottawa area.

But the region still only nominally remained one of the company's headquarters. With the recession that followed in 2001, the local workforce was gradually reduced back down to only 200 again and early in 2002, after almost 30 years as head office, the Kanata facilities were finally "boarded up", and “the real power shifted to the U.S. operations, where Chuck Winston, the chief executive at General Scanning and at GSI Lumonics, works".

The company's name was changed to GSI Group in 2005, then finally Novanta, its current name, in 2016.

After the Lumonics name disappeared, only weeks before his death in 2005, original co-founder Alan Buchanan told the Ottawa Citizen: “I am deeply disappointed that technology invented in Canada and the traditions of a company that developed it could be abused in this way".

The original Impact, LaserMark, and excimer laser product lines of Lumonics were sold by GSI Group in 2008/2009 to LightMachinery in the Nepean region of Ottawa, many of whose employees originally started out at Lumonics in Kanata.

== Products And Markets/Applications ==
Lumonics took a Canadian developed technology - the TEA CO_{2} laser - out of the government lab where it was first invented, beyond the university and government labs that were its initial customers, and successfully commercialized it into a reliable industrial tool.

It was first used for marking best before dates on beer and soft drink bottles, with Coca-Cola being its first customer, initially in a bottling plant of theirs in Ottawa, Canada followed by others in Montreal and Toronto.

This led to the "LaserMark" product line that was widely adopted for such date coding of consumer products in the food and drink packaging industry more generally as well as for model numbering of semiconductor and other electronic components.

A later and equally successful use of TEA CO_{2} lasers was the precision machining of polymer materials in applications such as the drilling of micro-holes in printed circuit boards and medical catheters and wire-stripping in medical devices such as pacemakers. As a product, these lasers were marketed by Lumonics under the “IMPACT” brand name.

Following these developments, Lumonics once again took another new kind of laser - the excimer laser - beyond scientific research labs and became the first company to introduce a truly industrial generation of such lasers capable of even higher precision than could be obtained with the earlier TEA CO_{2} lasers, eventually able to produce results not generally achievable through any other means, such as: Laser lift-off, Pulsed laser deposition, and the creation of wavelength selective optical fibers (Fiber Bragg gratings). This in turn enabled the development of entirely new manufacturing capabilities and products.

Including products based on other kinds of lasers developed by JK Lasers, with which Lumonics merged, subsequent applications encompassed the welding/soldering, machining/drilling, cutting, and stripping of industrial components more generally, especially in, for example, the automotive and aerospace industries.

In a medical collaboration, the University of Ottawa Heart Institute and scientists at Canada's National Research Council (NRC) used a Lumonics excimer laser as part of the first laser system in Canada (of only seven in the world) to treat coronary heart disease, culminating in the world's first excimer laser coronary angioplasty (ELCA) performed on a human.

On a technologically related front to Lumonics' primary business, Interoptics, which was acquired by them and renamed Lumonics Optics Group (and later WavePrecision) pioneered advanced optical manufacturing techniques and supplied many components to the telecom industry as well as constructing instruments for several space missions, in particular the MDI (or Michelson Doppler Imager) which was then replaced with the HMI (or Helioseismic and Magnetic Imager), with LightMachinery building the Michelson interferometer.

=== Products/Markets Matrix ===
| Products | Markets | | | | | |
| Products | Semiconductor Electronics | Medical Devices | Advanced Manufacturing | Packaging | Automotive | Aerospace |
|---|---|---|---|---|---|---|
| IMPACT® | Yes | Yes | | | | |
| IMPACT® GS-300 | Yes | | | | | |
| INDEX®-800 Excimer Lasers | Yes | Yes | | | | |
| JK700 Series Laser | Yes | | Yes | | Yes | Yes |
| Laserdyne® Model 140 | Yes | Yes | Yes | | | |
| Laserdyne® Model 550 Beam Director | | | Yes | | Yes | Yes |
| Laserdyne® Model 780 Beam Director | | | Yes | | Yes | Yes |
| Laserdyne® Model 890 Beam Director | | | Yes | | Yes | Yes |
| LaserMark® | Yes | | | Yes | | |
| LightWriter® SP/SPe | Yes | Yes | Yes | Yes | Yes | Yes |
| LightWriter® SpeTrayMarkerTM | Yes | | | | | |
| LightWriter® SP-CO2 | Yes | Yes | Yes | Yes | Yes | Yes |
| LuxStarTM | Yes | Yes | Yes | | | |
| MLDS Series 2000 | Yes | | | | | |
| MultiWaveTM Series Laser | | | Yes | | Yes | Yes |
| ScreenCut 4000 | Yes | | | | | |
| WaferMark® SigmaClean | Yes | | | | | |
| WaferMark® DSC | Yes | | | | | |
| WaferMark® DSC300 | Yes | | | | | |
| Xymark® | Yes | | | Yes | | |
| Xymark® Sprint II | Yes | | | Yes | | |
| Products | Markets | | | | | |
| Products | Semiconductor Electronics | Medical Devices | Advanced Manufacturing | Packaging | Automotive | Aerospace |

Optics Group: Products/Services, Markets
