= Beam homogenizer =

Device to create a more uniform laser beam

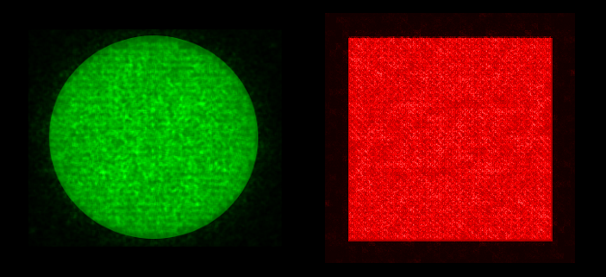
Intensity profile after use of diffractive homogenizer with coherent beam. Courtesy of Holo/Or

A beam homogenizer is a device that smooths out the irregularities in a laser beam profile to create a more uniform one. Most beam homogenizers use a multifaceted mirror with square facets. The mirror reflects light at different angles to create a beam with uniform power across the whole beam profile (a "top hat" profile). Some applications of beam homogenizers include their use with excimer lasers for making computer chips and with CO_{2} lasers for heat treating.

Most lasers produce a Gaussian beam energy distribution. A beam homogenizer will create an evenly distributed energy of the beam instead of the Gaussian shape. Unlike a beam shaper, which imparts a certain shape to the beam, a beam homogenizer spreads out the central concentrated energy of the beam among the entire beam diameter.

A simple beam homogenizer can be just a murky piece of glass. However, this is a very simple solution with low efficiency, producing a blurry beam. For most applications/uses, advanced methods of beam homogenizing are required such as diffractive beam homogenizers or using a micro lens array (MLA).
