= Output coupler =

Part of an optical resonator which allows intracavity light to be emitted

Principal components of a laser: 1. Active laser medium; 2. Laser pumping energy; 3. High reflector; 4. Output coupler; 5. Laser beam

In laser science, an output coupler (OC) is the component of an optical resonator that allows the extraction of a portion of the light from the laser's intracavity beam. An output coupler most often consists of a partially reflective mirror, allowing a certain portion of the intracavity beam to transmit through. Other methods include the use of almost-totally reflective mirrors at each end of the cavity, emitting the beam either by focusing it into a small hole drilled in the center of one mirror, or by redirecting through the use of rotating mirrors, prisms, or other optical devices, causing the beam to bypass one of the end mirrors at a given time.

== Partially reflective mirror ==
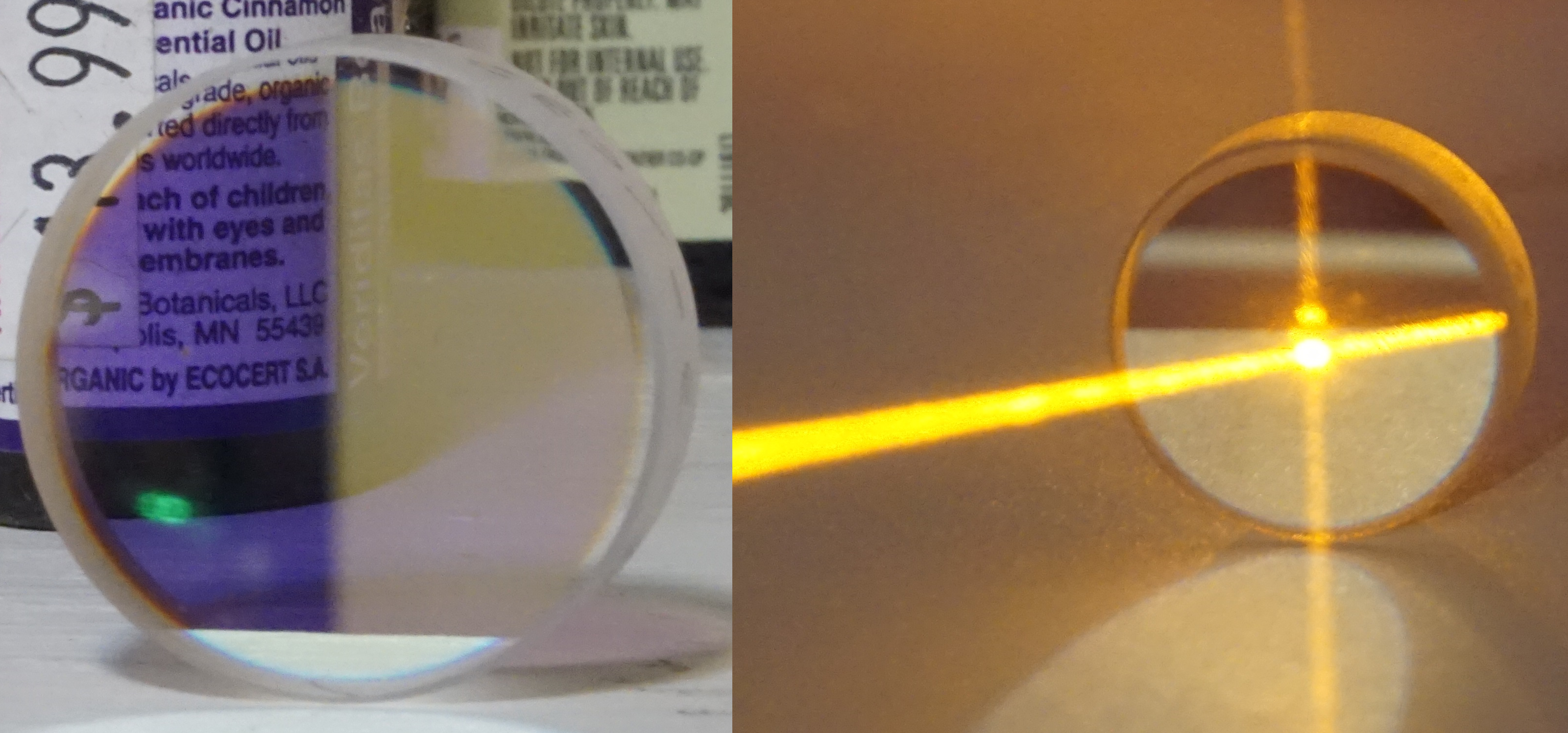
A dielectric output-coupler for a dye laser. Centered at 550 nm, the left photo shows its high reflectance to yellow light and its high transmittance to red and blue light. The right photo shows it reflecting 75% of a laser beam and transmitting 25%, although the beam appears brighter when moving toward the observer than when moving away.

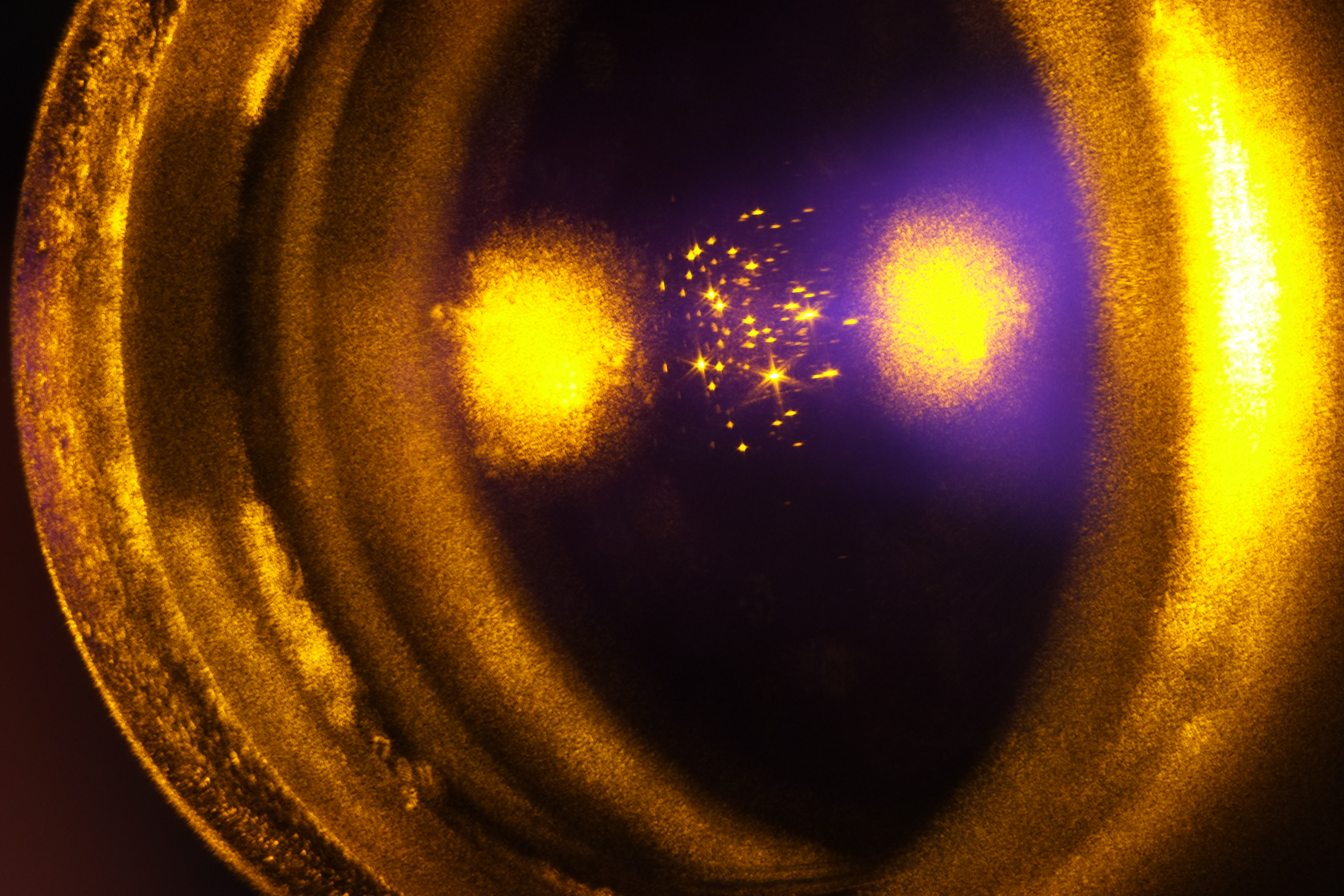
Output coupler of a 594 nm Helium−Neon laser

In its most common form, an output coupler consists of a partially reflective mirror, sometimes called a beamsplitter. The reflectance and transmittance of the mirror is usually determined by the gain of the laser medium. In some lasers the gain is very low, so the beam must make hundreds of passes through the medium for sufficient gain. In this case the output coupler may be as high as 99% reflective, transmitting only 1% of the cavity's beam to be used. A dye laser has very high gain compared to most solid-state lasers, so the beam needs to make just a few passes through the liquid to reach its optimum gain, thus the output coupler is typically around 80% reflective. In others, such as an excimer laser, the 4% reflectivity of uncoated glass provides enough of a mirror, transmitting nearly 96% of the intracavity beam.

Lasers operate by reflecting light between two or more mirrors that have an active laser medium between them. The medium amplifies the light by stimulated emission. For lasing to occur, the gain of the active medium must be larger than the total loss, which includes both unwanted effects such as absorption, emission in directions other than the beam path, and the intentional release of energy through the output coupler. In other words, the laser must attain threshold.

There are three important properties of the output coupler:

- Radii of curvature

The shape of the output coupler's surface, along with the shape of the high reflector, determine the stability of the optical cavity. The output coupler may be either flat or curved, depending on the design of the optical cavity. The radii of curvature is typically determined by the type of cavity desired (i.e.: plane/plane, concentric, confocal, etc.) along with the diameter and length of the cavity. The face of the output coupler facing into the cavity is the side with the applied partially reflective coating. This is the side which partially determines the laser modal properties. If this inner surface is curved then so must be the outer surface. This will stop the OC performing as a lens. The curvature of the outer surface can be designed to give a collimated laser output. This outer surface generally has an anti-reflection coating applied to maximise the output power. To minimize losses, enhance beam profile, and maximize coherence, the shape of the surface is usually manufactured to very high engineering tolerances, minimizing any deviation from an ideal surface. These deviations are typically kept so small they are measured in wavelengths of light, using devices such as interferometers or optical flats. Typically, a laser output coupler will be manufactured to tolerances within λ/10 (one tenth of the wavelength of the light) or better.

- Reflectivity

Depending on the gain of the medium, the amount of light the OC needs to reflect back can vary widely. Helium–neon lasers require around a 99% reflective mirror to lase, while nitrogen lasers have an extremely high gain (they are "superradiant") and do not require any OC (0% reflective). The reflectivity of any OC will vary with wavelength. Metal-coated mirrors generally have good reflectivity over a wide bandwidth, but may not cover an entire portion of the spectrum. Silver has up to 99.9% reflectivity in the visual range, but is a poor reflector of ultraviolet. Aluminum does not reflect infrared well, but is a good reflector from the visual range through the near-UV, whereas gold is highly reflective to infrared light but a poor reflector of wavelengths shorter than yellow. A dielectric mirror may have a tuning range as low as a 10 nm when designed for a specific wavelength, or can be designed with a wide range, spanning as much as 100 nm, for tunable lasers. For this reason the spectral properties of the OC are important to consider when a laser cavity is being assembled.

- Transmissivity

The material used as the mirror's substrate is also an important consideration. Most glasses have good transmissivity from the near UV to the near IR, but lasers that emit in shorter or longer wavelengths may require a different substrate. For example, zinc selenide is typically used in carbon-dioxide lasers because of its high transmittance to infrared wavelengths.

== Cavity dumper ==
A cavity dumper is an output coupler that performs the function of a Q-switch. It allows the energy to build up in the optical cavity and then releases it at a specifically timed interval. This allows the beam to build up to high levels and then be released in a very short time; often within the time it takes a light wave to complete one round-trip through the cavity, hence the name. After building in intensity the cavity suddenly "dumps" its energy. Cavity dumpers usually use a high-reflective mirror on each end of the cavity, allowing the beam to receive full gain from the medium. At a specific interval, the beam is redirected, using a device such as a Pockels cell, an acousto-optic modulator, or a fast-rotating prism or mirror. This redirected beam bypasses the end mirror, allowing a very powerful pulse to be emitted. Cavity dumpers can be used for continuous-wave operation, but their most common use is with mode-locked lasers, to extract a very short pulse at its peak intensity.

== See also ==
- Laser construction
