= Rayman (disambiguation) =

Rayman is a video game franchise.

Rayman may also refer to:

== People ==
- Allan Rayman, Canadian singer/songwriter
- Marcel Rajman (1923−1944), Polish Jew and French resistance fighters, also known as Marcel Rayman
- Ruth Rayman, retired Canadian engineer
- Will Rayman (born 1997), American-Israeli basketball player

== Other uses ==
- 10050 Rayman, an asteroid
- Rayman (video game), the first video game in the series
- Rayman (character), the main character of the Rayman video game series

== See also ==
- Rayman: The Animated Series
- Ray (disambiguation)
