= Injection seeder =

Injection seeders are devices that direct the output of small "seed" lasers into the cavity of a much larger laser to stabilize the latter's output. Most seed lasers are stable, single-frequency lasers that emit within the linewidth of the larger laser's gain medium. The single frequency encourages the larger laser to lase in a single longitudinal mode, and the seed laser can also improve the laser's spatial profile and improve the M^{2} parameter. Seed lasers can be continuous or pulsed. Seeding a pulsed laser can reduce variations in the output energy and timing (jitter) from pulse to pulse, and smooth out temporal variations within the pulse. Many commercial lasers use a laser diode as a seeding source.

== See also ==
- Laser construction
- Q-switching
- Mode locking

== Bibliography ==
- Boichenko, V.L.; Zasavitskii, I.I.; Kosichkin, Yu.V.; Tarasevich, A.P.; Tunkin, V.G.; Shotov, A.P. (1984). "Picosecond parametric oscillator amplifying radiation from a tunable semiconductor laser". Soviet Journal of Quantum Electronics. 11 (1): 141–143. doi:10.1070/QE1984v014n01ABEH004663.
- Magnitskii, S.A.; Malakhova, V.I.; Tarasevich, A.P.; Tunkin, V.G.; Yakubovich, S.D. (1986). "Generation of bandwidth-limited tunable picosecond pulses by injection-locked optical parametric oscillator". Optics Letters. 11 (1): 18–20. Bibcode:1986OptL...11...18M. doi:10.1364/ol.11.000018. PMID 19730518.
