= Jacques Beaulieu =

Canadian physicist

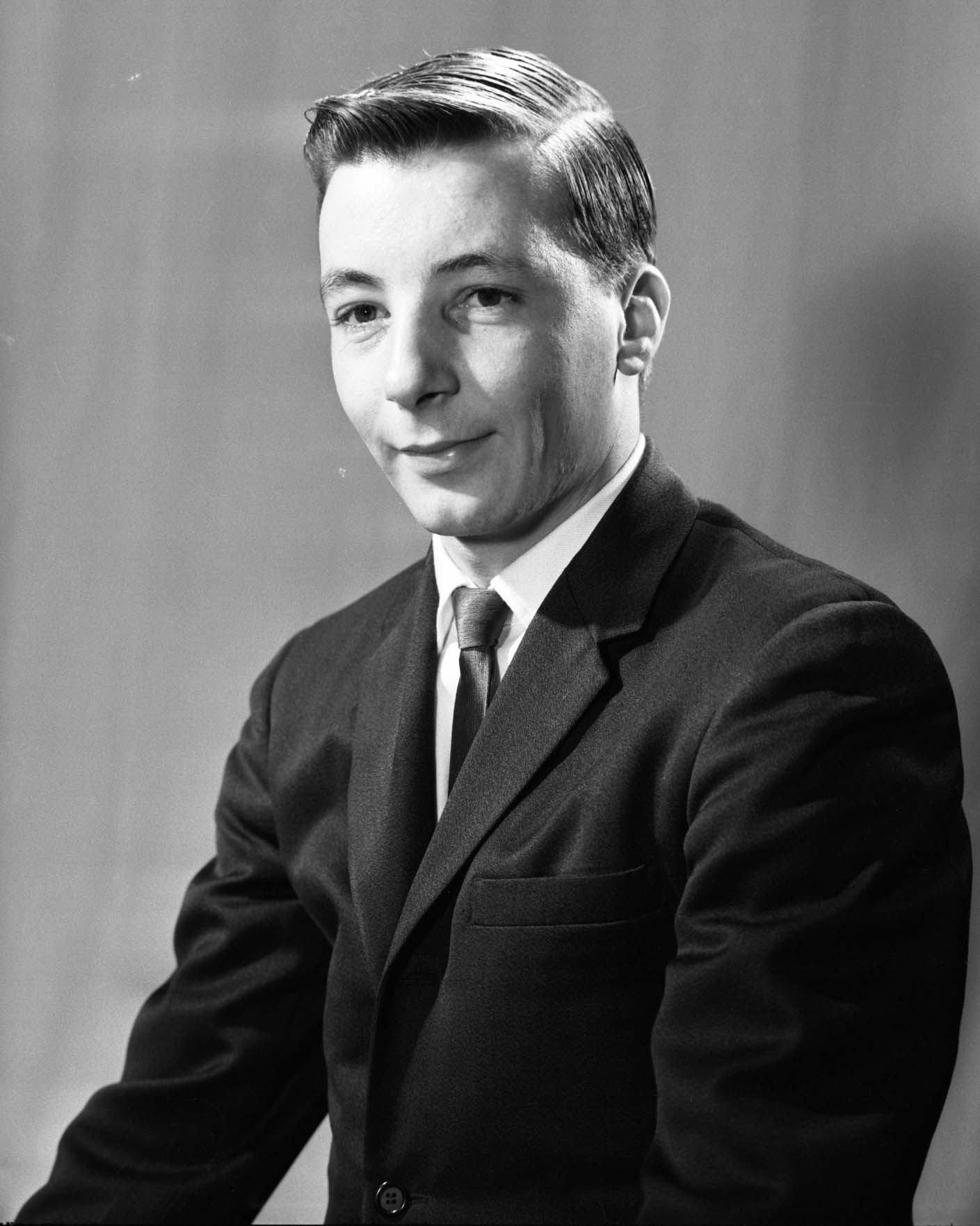
- Born: April 15, 1932; Saint-Jean-sur-Richelieu, Quebec
- Died: August 19, 2014 (aged 82); Quebec
- Education: McGill University
- Occupation: physicist
- Known for: invented the TEA laser
- Awards: Order of Canada; National Order of Quebec

Jacques A. Beaulieu, OC GOQ MSRC (April 15, 1932 – August 19, 2014) was a Canadian physicist who invented the first TEA laser in 1968.

== Awards ==
In 1978, he was awarded the Royal Society of Canada's Thomas W. Eadie Medal. In 1980, he was made a Fellow of the Royal Society of Canada.

In 1999, he was made a Grand Officer of the National Order of Quebec.

In 2002, he was made an Officer of the Order of Canada in recognition of his "major influence on the development of lasers and their application in the fields of defence and medicine".
