= Ruth Rayman =

Canadian engineer

- Awards: One of McMaster University’s top 150 engineering alumni
- Scientific career
- Fields: Engineering Physics and Management
- Institutions: National Research Council Canada

Ruth Rayman is a Canadian retired engineer. She was the director general of the Advanced Electronics and Photonics Research Centre at the National Research Council of Canada, and the president of the Canadian Photonics Consortium.

== Education ==
Rayman obtained her bachelor of Engineering Physics and Management at McMaster University in 1984. She went on to complete her Master of Business Administration at the University of Ottawa, graduating in 1991. In 2015, she obtained an Executive Certificate in Leadership from the MIT Sloan School of Management.

== Career ==
Rayman began her career at Bell Northern Research working with photonics.

From 2003 to 2005, she was the President of the Canadian Photonics Consortium. She also held senior management positions at RCA Electro-Optics, Nortel Networks and Lumonics.

In 2007, she joined the National Research Council Canada, and was the Director General of the Advanced Electronics and Photonics Research Centre. Her work included collaborative research to develop integrated photonics and printable electronics. She retired from her position at the NRC in 2021.

Currently, Rayman is a member of:

- Scientific Advisory Committee of the National Optics Institute (INO)
- Carleton University’s Photonics and Laser Technology Program Advisory Committee
- Canadian Photonic Industry Consortium's Board of Directors
- Invest Ottawa’s Global Expansion Committee

== Awards ==
Since 2005, Rayman has been a Warden of the Iron Ring in recognition of her efforts to promote women in STEM fields. In 2017, she was chosen as one of McMaster University's top 150 engineering alumni.
