= Nitrogen laser =

Type of gas laser

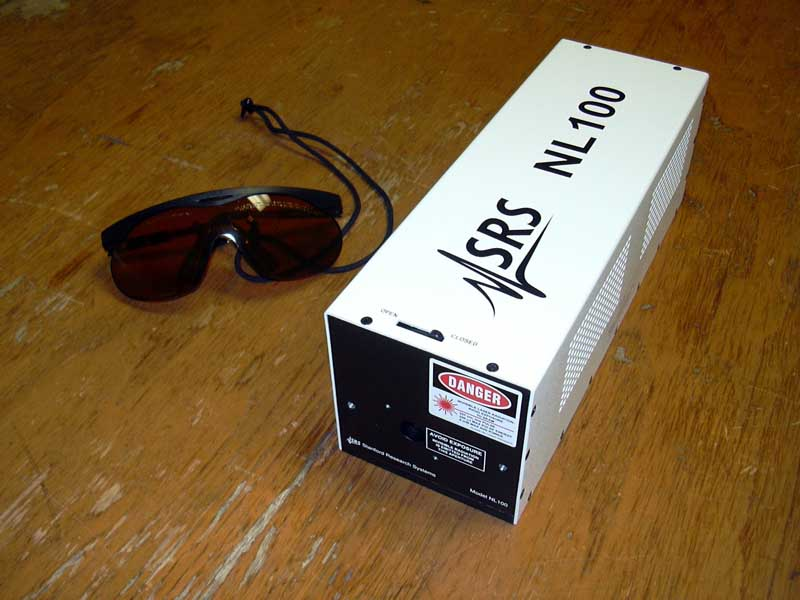
A 337nm wavelength and 170 μJ pulse energy 20 Hz cartridge nitrogen laser

A nitrogen laser is a gas laser operating in the ultraviolet range (typically 337.1 nm) using molecular nitrogen as its gain medium, pumped by an electrical discharge.

The wall-plug efficiency of the nitrogen laser is low, typically 0.1% or less, though nitrogen lasers with efficiency of up to 3% have been reported in the literature. The wall-plug efficiency is the product of the following three efficiencies:

- electrical: TEA laser
- gain medium: This is the same for all nitrogen lasers and thus has to be at least 3%
  - inversion by electron impact is 10 to 1 due to Franck–Condon principle
  - energy lost in the lower laser level: 40%
- optical: More stimulated emission than spontaneous emission

== Gain medium ==
The gain medium is nitrogen molecules in the gas phase. The nitrogen laser is a three-level laser. In contrast to more typical four-level lasers, the upper laser level of nitrogen is directly pumped, imposing no speed limits on the pump. Pumping is normally provided by direct electron impact; the electrons must have sufficient energy, or they will fail to excite the upper laser level. Typically reported optimum values are in the range of 80 to 100 eV per Torr·cm pressure of nitrogen gas.

There is a 40 ns upper limit of laser lifetime at low pressures and the lifetime becomes shorter as the pressure increases. The lifetime is only 1 to 2 ns at 1 atmosphere. In general

$$t [\mathrm{ns}] = \cfrac{36}{1+12.8*p[\mathrm{bar}]}.$$

The strongest lines are at 337.1 nm wavelength in the ultraviolet. Other lines have been reported at 357.6 nm, also ultraviolet. This information refers to the second positive system of molecular nitrogen, which is by far the most common. No vibration of the two nitrogen atoms is involved, because the atom-atom distance does not change with the electronic transition. The rotation needs to change to deliver the angular momentum of the photon, furthermore multiple rotational states are populated at room temperature. There are also lines in the far-red and infrared from the first positive system, and a visible blue laser line from the molecular nitrogen positive (1+) ion.

The metastable lower level lifetime is 40 μs, thus, the laser self-terminates, typically in less than 20 ns. This type of self-termination is sometimes referred to as "bottlenecking in the lower level". This is only a rule of thumb as is seen in many other lasers: The helium–neon laser also has a bottleneck as one decay step needs the walls of the cavity and this laser typically runs in continuous mode. Several organic dyes with upper level lifetimes of less than 10 ns have been used in continuous mode. The Nd:YAG laser has an upper level lifetime of 230 μs, yet it also supports 100 ps pulses.

Repetition rates can range as high as a few kHz, provided adequate gas flow and cooling of the structure are provided. Cold nitrogen is a better medium than hot nitrogen, and this appears to be part of the reason that the pulse energy and power drop as the repetition rate increases to more than a few pulses per second. There are also, apparently, issues involving ions remaining in the laser channel.

Air, which is 78% nitrogen, can be used, but more than 0.5% oxygen poisons the laser.

== Optics ==
Nitrogen lasers can operate within a resonator cavity, but due to the typical gain of 2 every 20 mm they more often operate on superradiance alone; though it is common to put a mirror at one end such that the output is emitted from the opposite end.

For a 10 mm wide gain volume diffraction comes into play after 30 m along the gain medium, a length which is unheard of. Thus this laser does not need a concave lens or refocusing lenses and beam quality improves along the gain medium. The height of the pumped volume may be as small as 1 mm, needing a refocusing lens already after 0.3 m. A simple solution is to use rounded electrodes with a large radius, so that a quadratic pump profile is obtained.

== Electrical ==
The gain medium is usually pumped by a transverse electrical discharge. When the pressure is at (or above) atmospheric pressure, the configuration is called a TEA laser (TEA being an acronym for Transverse Electrical discharge in gas at Atmospheric pressure).

=== Microscopic description of a fast discharge ===
In a strong external electric field this electron creates an electron avalanche in the direction of the electric field lines. Diffusion of electrons and elastic scattering at a buffer gas molecule spreads the avalanche perpendicular to the field. Inelastic scattering creates photons, which create new avalanches centimeters away. After some time the electric charge in the avalanche becomes so large that following Coulomb's law it generates an electric field as large as the external electric field. At regions of increased field strength the avalanche effect is enhanced. This leads to electric arc like discharges called streamers. A mix of a noble gas (up to 0.9) and nitrogen enhance elastic scattering of electrons over electron multiplying and thus widens avalanches and streamers.

Spark gaps use a high density of gas molecules and a low density of initial electrons to favor streamers. Electrons are removed by a slowly rising voltage. A high density gas increases the breakdown field, thus shorter arcs can be used with lower inductance and the capacity between the electrodes is increased. A wide streamer has a lower inductance.

Gas lasers use low density of gas molecules and a high density of initial electrons to prevent streamers. Electrons are added by preionisation not removed by oxygen, because nitrogen from bottles is used. Wide avalanches can excite more nitrogen molecules.

Inelastic scattering heats up a molecule, so that in a second scattering the probability of electron emission is increased. This leads to an arc. Typically arcing occurs after lasing in nitrogen. The streamer in the spark gap discharges the electrodes only by means of image charge, thus when the streamer touches both electrodes most of the charge is still available to feed the arc; additional charge is stored on the distribution plates. Thus arcing in the spark gap starts before lasing.

Conditions for pulsed avalanche discharges are described by Levatter and Lin.

=== Electrodynamics ===
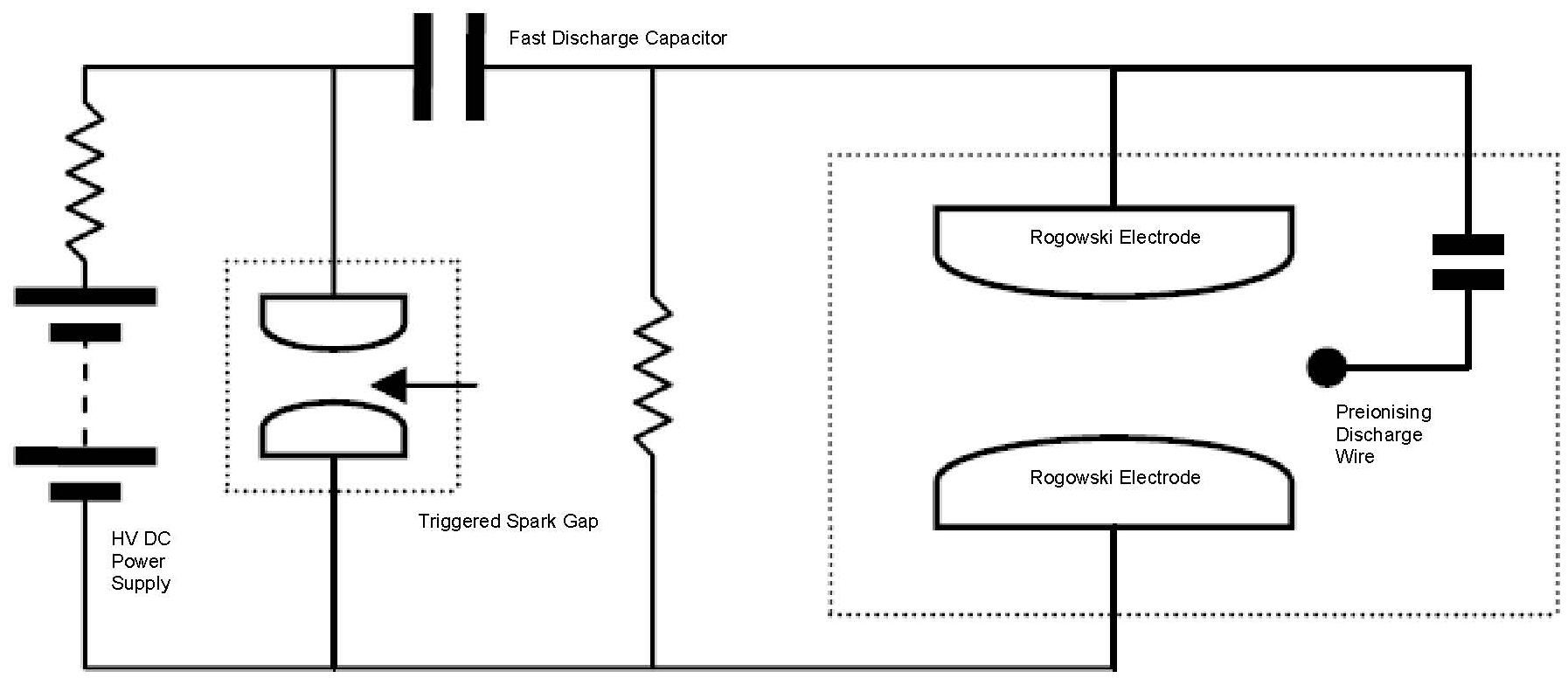
Circuit.

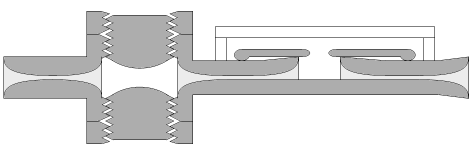
Low inductance implementation cross cut. Erratum: Right cap needs to be bigger.

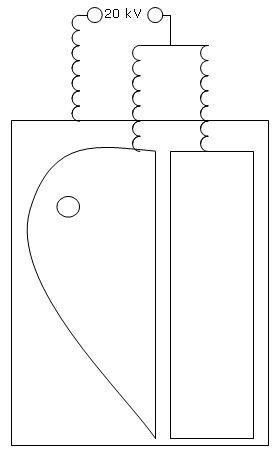
Low inductance implementation top view. Erratum: Caps should be slightly longer than the channel and have rounded corners.

The electronics is a circuit composed of a spark gap, a capacitor, and the discharge through the nitrogen. First the spark gap and the capacitor are charged. The spark gap then discharges itself and voltage is applied to the nitrogen.

An alternative construction uses two capacitors connected as a Blumlein generator. Two capacitors are connected so that one plate is a common earth, the others are each connected to the spark gap electrodes. These capacitors are often constructed from a single layer of printed circuit board, or similar stack of copper foil and thin dielectric. The capacitors are linked through an inductor, a simple air-spaced coil. One capacitor also has a small spark gap across it. When HT is applied, the two capacitors are charged slowly, effectively linked by the inductor. When the spark gap reaches its triggering voltage, it discharges and quickly reduces that capacitor's voltage to zero. As the discharge is rapid, the inductor acts as an open circuit and so the voltage difference across the transverse spark gap (between the two capacitors) rises rapidly until the main spark gap discharges, firing the laser.

The speed of either circuit is increased in two steps. First, the inductance of all components is reduced by shortening and widening conductors and by squeezing the circuit into a flat rectangle. The total inductance is the sum of the components:

object	length	thickness	width	width	inductance	inductance	inductance	capacity	oscillation
			as coil	as wire	measured	coil theory	wire theory	plate theory	period
unit	m	m	m	m	nH	nH	nH	nF	ns
spark gap	2×10^{−2}	1×10^{−2}	2×10^{−2}	1×10^{−5}	10	12.57	13.70	0.0004	
metal tape	2×10^{−2}	2×10^{−2}	4×10^{−2}	5×10^{−3}		12.57	5.32	0.0004	
cap. 1	2×10^{−1}	4×10^{−4}	3×10^{−1}			0.34		2.6563	
metal tape	2×10^{−2}	2×10^{−2}	3×10^{−1}			1.68		0.0027	
laser channel	1×10^{−2}	2×10^{−2}	3×10^{−1}			0.84		0.0013	
metal tape	2×10^{−2}	2×10^{−2}	3×10^{−1}			1.68		0.0027	
cap. 2	3×10^{−1}	4×10^{−4}	3×10^{−1}			0.50		3.9844	
spark osc.						22.90		2.6563	49
disch. osc.						5.03		1.5938	18

The intense discharge is reported to distort oscilloscopes nearby. This can be reduced by building the laser symmetrically into a grounded cylinder with the spark gap at the bottom, the laser at the top, capacitor 1 left and right, and capacitor 2 left and right stacked onto capacitor 1. This has the further advantage of reducing the inductance. And this has the disadvantage that the laser channel cannot be inspected for sparks anymore.

Secondly, transmission line theory and waveguide theory is applied to achieve a traveling wave excitation. Measured nitrogen laser pulses are so long that the second step is unimportant. From this analysis it follows that:

- the end mirror and the spark gap are on the same side
- a long narrow laser at atmospheric pressures is ineffective

=== Spark gap ===
Paschen's law states that the length of the spark gap is inverse-proportional to the pressure. For a fixed length to diameter ratio of the spark, the inductance is proportional to the length (source , compare with: dipole antenna ). Thus the electrodes of the spark gap are glued or welded on a dielectric spacer-ring. To reduce the danger due to the pressure, the volume is minimized. To prevent sparks outside space ring in the low pressure the spacer usually gets thicker outwards in an s-shaped manner.

Connection between spark gap and laser channel based on traveling wave theory:

- The low inductance spark gap may be inserted into a strip transmission line
- biconical spark gap
- biconical spark gap
- biconical spark gap

The breakdown voltage is low for helium, medium for nitrogen and high for SF_{6}, though nothing is said about the spark thickness variations.

Rise times as high as 8×10^{10} A/s are possible with a spark gap. This nicely matches the typical rise times of 1×10^{−8} s and typical currents of 1×10^{3} A occurring in nitrogen lasers.

A cascade of spark gaps allows to use a weak trigger pulse to initiate a streamer in the smaller gap, wait for its transition into an arc, and then for this arc to extend into the larger gap. Still the first spark gap in the cascade needs a free electron to start with, so jitter is rather high.

=== Preionisation ===
Avalanches homogenize a discharge fast mostly along the field lines. With a short duration (<10 ms) since the last laser pulse enough ions are left over so that all avalanches overlap also laterally. With low pressure (<100 kPa) the max charge carrier density is low and the electromagnetic driven transition from avalanche to spark is inhibited.

In other cases UV radiation homogenizes a discharge slowly perpendicular to a discharge. These are brought into balance by placing two linear discharges next to each other 1 cm apart. The first discharge is across a smaller gap and starts early. Due to the low number of initial electrons streamers typically 1 mm apart are seen. The electrodes for the first discharge are covered by a dielectric, which limits this discharge. Therefore the voltage is able to rise further until avalanches can start in the second gap. These are so many that they overlap and excite every molecule.

With about 11 ns the UV generation, ionisation, and electron capture are in a similar speed regime as the nitrogen laser pulse duration and thus as fast electric must be applied.

=== Excitation by electron impact ===
The upper laser level is excited efficiently by electrons with more than 11 eV, best energy is 15 eV. The electron temperature in the streamers only reaches 0.7 eV. Helium due to its higher ionisation energy and lack of vibrational excitations increases the temperature to 2.2 eV. Higher voltages increase the temperature. Higher voltages mean shorter pulses.

== Typical devices ==
The gas pressure in a nitrogen laser ranges from a few mbar to as much as several bar. Air provides significantly less output energy than pure nitrogen or a mixture of nitrogen and helium. The pulse energy ranges from 1 μJ to about 1 mJ; peak powers between 1 kW and 3 MW can be achieved. Pulse durations vary from a few hundred picoseconds (at 1 atmosphere partial pressure of nitrogen) to about 30 nanoseconds at reduced pressure (typically some dozens of Torr), though FWHM pulsewidths of 6 to 8 ns are typical.

=== Amateur construction ===
The transverse discharge nitrogen laser has long been a popular choice for amateur home construction, owing to its simple construction and simple gas handling. It was described by Scientific American in 1974, as one of the first laser home-construction articles. As there is no cavity in place for this air laser, the device is not strictly a laser, but uses amplified stimulated emission (ASE).

== Applications ==
- Transverse optical pumping of dye lasers
- measurement of air pollution (Lidar)
- Matrix-assisted laser desorption/ionization
- List of laser articles
