= Gas laser =

Laser in which electricity is discharged through gas

A gas laser is a laser in which an electric current is discharged through a gas to produce coherent light. The gas laser was the first continuous-light laser and the first laser to operate on the principle of converting electrical energy to a laser light output. The first gas laser, the Helium–neon laser (HeNe), was co-invented by Iranian engineer and scientist Ali Javan and American physicist William R. Bennett, Jr., in 1960. It produced a coherent light beam in the infrared region of the spectrum at 1.15 micrometres.

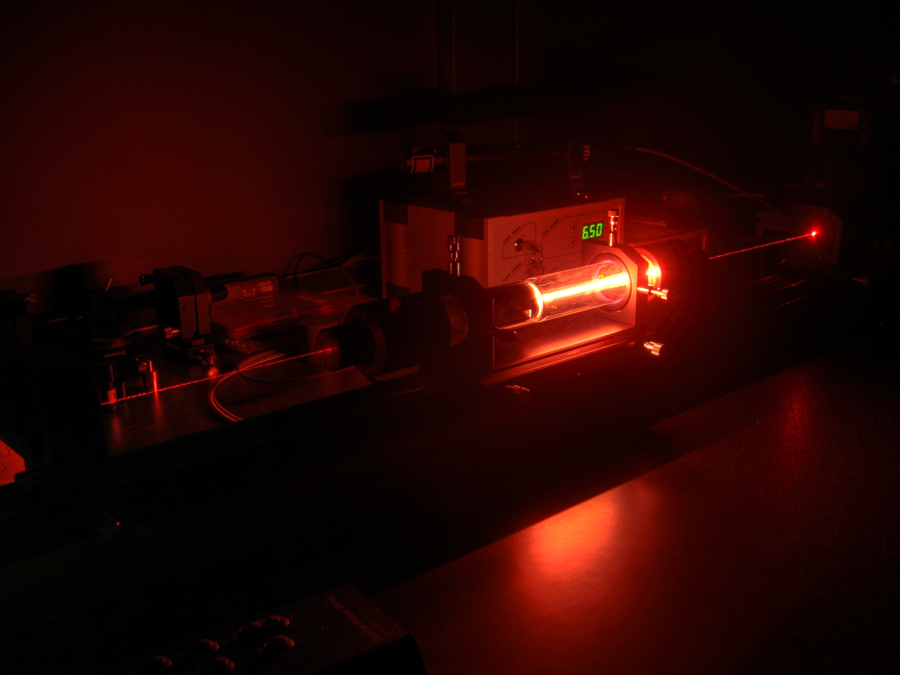
A helium-neon laser is a well-known type of gas laser

== Types of gas laser ==
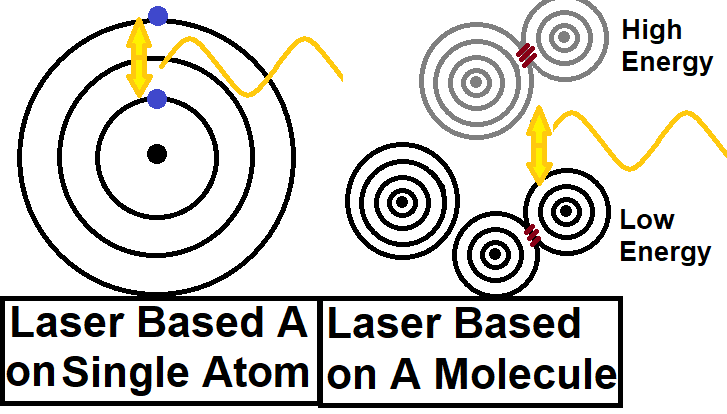
A gas laser cycles molecules from a low to a high energy state to create a laser beam, this is opposed to lasers that cycle an electron inside an atom.

Gas lasers using many gases have been built and used for many purposes.

Carbon dioxide lasers, or CO_{2} lasers can emit hundreds of kilowatts at 9.6 μm and 10.6 μm, and are often used in industry for cutting and welding. The efficiency of a CO_{2} laser is over 10%.

Carbon monoxide or "CO" lasers have the potential for very large outputs, but the use of this type of laser is limited by the toxicity of carbon monoxide gas. Human operators must be protected from this deadly gas. Furthermore, it is extremely corrosive to many materials including seals, gaskets, etc.

Helium–neon (HeNe) lasers can be made to oscillate at over 160 different wavelengths by adjusting the cavity Q to peak at the desired wavelength. This can be done by adjusting the spectral response of the mirrors or by using a dispersive element (Littrow prism) in the cavity. Units operating at 633 nm are very common in schools and laboratories because of their low cost and near-perfect beam qualities.

Nitrogen lasers operate in the ultraviolet range, typically 337.1 nm, using molecular nitrogen as its gain medium, pumped by an electrical discharge.

TEA lasers are energized by a high voltage electrical discharge in a gas mixture generally at or above atmospheric pressure. The acronym "TEA" stands for Transversely Excited Atmospheric.

=== Chemical lasers ===
Chemical lasers are powered by a chemical reaction and can achieve high powers in continuous operation. For example, in the hydrogen fluoride laser (2.7–2.9 μm) and the deuterium fluoride laser (3.8 μm) the reaction is the combination of hydrogen or deuterium gas with combustion products of ethylene in nitrogen trifluoride. They were invented by George C. Pimentel.

Chemical lasers are powered by a chemical reaction permitting a large amount of energy to be released quickly. Such very high power lasers are especially of interest to the military. Further, continuous-wave chemical lasers at very high power levels, fed by streams of gasses, have been developed and have some industrial applications.

=== Excimer lasers ===
Excimer lasers are powered by a chemical reaction involving an excited dimer, or excimer, which is a short-lived dimeric or heterodimeric molecule formed from two species (atoms), at least one of which is in an excited electronic state. They typically produce ultraviolet light, and are used in semiconductor photolithography and in LASIK eye surgery. Commonly used excimer molecules include F_{2} (fluorine, emitting at 157 nm), and noble gas compounds (ArF [193 nm], KrCl [222 nm], KrF [248 nm], XeCl [308 nm], and XeF [351 nm]).

=== Ion lasers ===
Argon-ion lasers emit light in the range 351–528.7 nm. Depending on the optics and the laser tube a different number of lines is usable but the most commonly used lines are 458 nm, 488 nm and 514.5 nm.

=== Metal-vapor lasers ===
Metal-vapor lasers are gas lasers that typically generate ultraviolet wavelengths. Helium-silver (HeAg) 224 nm, neon-copper (NeCu) 248 nm and helium-cadmium (HeCd) 325 nm are three examples. These lasers have particularly narrow oscillation linewidths of less than 3 GHz (500 femtometers), making them candidates for use in fluorescence suppressed Raman spectroscopy.

The Copper vapor laser, with two spectral lines of green (510.6 nm) and yellow (578.2 nm), is the most powerful laser with the highest efficiency in the visible spectrum.

== Advantages ==
- High volume of active material
- Active material is relatively inexpensive
- Almost impossible to damage the active material
- Heat can be removed quickly from the cavity

== Applications ==
- He-Ne laser is mainly used in making holograms.
- In laser printing He-Ne laser is used as a source for writing on the photosensitive material.
- He-Ne lasers were used in reading Bar Codes, which are imprinted on products in stores. They have been largely replaced by laser diodes.
- Nitrogen lasers and excimer laser are used in pulsed dye laser pumping.
- Ion lasers, mostly argon, are used in CW dye laser pumping.

== See also ==
- Gas dynamic laser
- Brewster window
- List of laser types
