= Holo/Or =

International high-tech company

- Company type: private company
- Industry: Optoelectronics, Diffractive optics
- Founded: 1989
- Headquarters: Ness Ziona, Israel
- Key people: Israel Grossinger (President and CEO)
- Services: design, manufacturing and commercialization
- Website: www.holoor.co.il

Holo/Or is an international high-tech company, dedicated to the design, manufacturing and commercialization of new products based on diffractive optical elements (DOEs).

== Company profile ==
Holo/Or is a leading company in the field of diffractive optical design and manufacture. Among the more popular products offered by Holo/Or are top-hat beam shapers, used in many industrial micro-machining and materials processing applications, high-power beam homogenizers/diffusers, beam splitters/samplers for multi-spot and power monitoring applications, and vortex lenses, used in metal-cutting and particle-trapping.

== History ==
Holo/Or was founded in 1989 by Israel Grossinger, a pioneer in the commercialization of diffractive optical elements (DOEs). Back then, DOEs were found almost exclusively in various research institutes. Mr. Grossinger, occupying then the post of VP R&D at Indigo (sold later to HP), identified the commercial potential of this area. The first product manufactured at Holo/Or was the DWM (Dual Wavelength Module), proposed to a leading company in the field of medical laser systems, Coherent Medical. This was also the first commercial partnership of Holo/Or.

Holo/Or's Dual Wavelength lens was the first commercial DOE in the world. These lenses correct the strong chromatic and spherical aberrations between a CO_{2} laser and its red aiming, and unite both beams to a single diffraction-limited focal point beam, by the use of a diffractive surface pattern. This product continues to be used in surgical laser systems and FTIR systems.

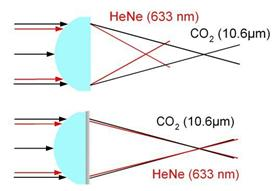
Dual Wavelength Lens, are still used in Surgical Laser systems

The company has recorded several international patents. in various applications such as: IOL (Intra-ocular Lenses), Fundus cameras, hair coloring diagnostics, guiding systems, portable scanners and aesthetic laser treatment.
