= JK Lasers =

- Founded: 1972
- Founder: Ron Burbeck; Jim Wright
- Headquarters: Rugby, Warwickshire, England
- Products: Fiber lasers, pulsed lasers, laser rods
- Website: www.jklasers.com

JK Lasers was a global laser manufacturer based in Rugby, Warwickshire, England. It started out in the research division of Associated Electrical Industries (AEI) in Rugby. When AEI was bought by conglomerate GEC in the late 1960s, the laser team did not wish to move, so they set up their own company. Established by Ron Burbeck and Dr Jim Wright MBE in 1972, the company first launched a range of pulsed lasers using ruby, YAG and glass laser rods. This was followed by the MS-Series of Nd:YAG laser systems, designed for industrial welding, cutting and drilling applications.

In 1982, JK Lasers was acquired by Canadian company Lumonics to form one of the largest laser companies in the world. Lumonics merged with General Scanning Incorporated (GSI) in 1999 and, following the sale of the Lumonics brand, the laser segment of the business changed its name to the GSI Group Laser Division. Under this name, the company launched its first rack-mountable ytterbium industrial fiber lasers in 2007.

The GSI Group Laser Division completed a rebrand back to JK Lasers in August 2012. General Manager Dr Mark Greenwood said: “The rebrand to JK Lasers is an important step for us. It is a return to our roots; a recognition of our long and successful history.” JK Lasers range of products includes watt to kilowatt fiber lasers, CO_{2} lasers, Nd:YAG lasers, process tools and software. Its first multi-kiloWatt class of fiber lasers, the JK2000FL, was launched in April 2012.

In April 2015 GSI sold its JK Lasers subsidiary to SPI Lasers, part of the Trumpf group. All products were rebranded with the SPI logo, essentially ending the JK brand.

== Awards ==
In 1978, JK Lasers was awarded The Queen's Award for Export Achievement. This was followed in 1990 with The Queen's Award for Technological Achievement. In 2005, the company was named ‘Outstanding partner in Engineering and Technology’ by McNeil Consumer and Specialty Pharmaceuticals Dr Jim Wright's "outstanding contribution" to the industrial use of lasers in the UK was recognised with the AILU Award in 1998.
