= TEA laser =

Transversely excited atmospheric gas laser

A TEA laser, or transversely excited atmospheric laser, is a gas laser energized by a high-voltage electrical discharge in a gas mixture generally at or above atmospheric pressure. The most common types are carbon dioxide lasers and excimer lasers, both used extensively in industry and research; less common are nitrogen lasers.

== History ==
=== Invention ===
The carbon dioxide (CO_{2}) TEA laser was invented in the late 1960s by Jacques Beaulieu working at the Defence Research and Development Canada at Valcartier in Quebec, Canada. The development was kept secret until 1970, when brief details were published.

In 1963, C. Kumar N. Patel, working at Bell Telephone Laboratories, first demonstrated laser output at 10.6 μm from a low pressure RF-excited CO_{2} gas discharge. With the addition of nitrogen and helium and using a DC electrical discharge, CW powers of around 100 W were achieved. By pulsing the discharge using higher voltages, or Q-switching using a rotating mirror, pulse powers of a few kilowatts could be obtained as a practical limit.

Higher peak powers could only be achieved by increasing the density of excited CO_{2} molecules. The capacity for stored energy per unit volume of gas increases linearly with density and thus gas pressure, but the voltage needed to achieve gas breakdown and couple energy into the upper laser levels increases at the same rate. The practical solution avoiding very high voltages was to pulse the voltage transversely to the optical axis (rather than longitudinally as was the case for low pressure lasers), limiting the breakdown distance to a few centimetres. This allowed the use of manageable voltages of a few tens of kV. The problem was how to initiate and stabilize a glow discharge at these much higher gas pressures, without the discharge degenerating into a bright high-current arc, and how to achieve this over a useful volume of gas.

=== CO_{2} TEA laser ===
Beaulieu reported a transversely-excited atmospheric-pressure CO_{2} laser. His solution to the problem of arc formation was to have a conducting bar facing a linear array of pins with a separation of a few centimetres. The pins were individually loaded with resistors forcing the discharge from each pin into a low current brush or glow discharge which fanned out towards the bar. The laser cavity probed 100 to 200 of these discharges in series providing the laser gain. A fast discharge capacitor rapidly switched across the laser electrodes using a spark gap or thyratron provided the high voltage pulses.

These first "Pin-Bar" TEA lasers, operating at around one pulse per second, were easy and cheap to construct. By operating at atmospheric pressure, complex vacuum and gas-handling systems could be avoided. They could produce MW peak powers of a few 100 ns duration capable of breaking down air if brought to a focus with a short focal-length lens. Disadvantages were poor gain symmetry, dissipation in the resistors and size.

=== Pearson and Lamberton ===
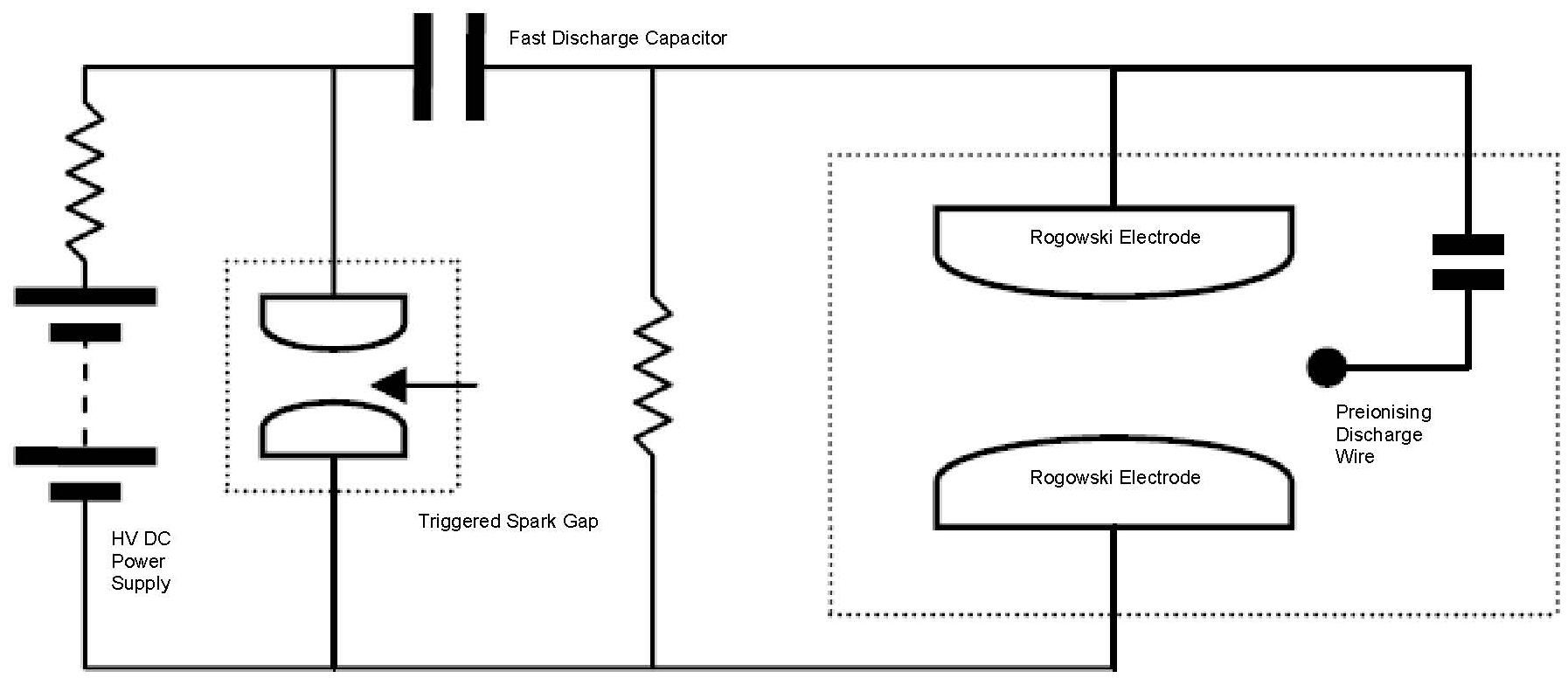
TEA CO_{2} Laser circuit

The first true (non pin-bar) TEA laser was realized by Pearson and Lamberton working at the UK MOD Services Electronic Research Laboratory at Baldock. They used a pair of Rogowski-profiled electrodes separated by one or two centimetres. Their double-discharged design coupled part of the discharge energy to a thin wire running parallel to, and offset from, one side of the electrodes. This served to pre-ionise the gas resulting in a uniform volumetric glow-discharge. Of equal importance to preionisation, was the need for the discharge to be very fast. By dumping energy into the gas rapidly, high-current arcs had no time to form.

Pearson and Lamberton used a streak camera to verify the sequence of events. As the voltage was erected across the electrodes, field emission from the thin wire resulted in a sheet discharge between itself and the anode. Since the subsequent main discharge started from the cathode, it was suggested that photoemission was the initiating mechanism. Subsequently, other workers had demonstrated alternative methods for achieving preionisation. These included dielectrically isolated wires and electrodes, sliding spark arrays, electron beams and pins impedance-loaded with capacitors.

The original Pearson–Lamberton TEA laser could be operated at around one pulse per second when switched with a spark gap discharging a capacitor resistively charged from a DC power supply. By circulating the gas between the electrodes, which was using lossless capacitor charging and replacing the spark-gap with a thyratron, repetition rates in excess of a thousand pulses per second were subsequently achieved with various designs of TEA laser.

=== Double-discharge method ===
The double-discharge method required to initiate stable high-pressure gas discharges can be used both below and above atmospheric pressure, and these devices too can be referred to as TEA lasers. Commercial excimer lasers operating in the ultraviolet use a double-discharge regime very similar to the CO_{2} TEA laser. Using krypton, argon or xenon chloride or fluoride gas buffered with helium to 2–3 atmospheres of pressure, excimer lasers can produce megawatt pulses of ultraviolet laser light.

=== Microscopic discharge description ===
In most over-voltage spark gaps, avalanches of electrons move towards the anode. As the number of electrons increases Coulomb's law states that the field strength also increases. The strong field accelerates the avalanche. A slow rise time of the voltage lets the electrons drift towards the anode before they can generate an avalanche. Electrophilic molecules capture electrons before they can generate an avalanche. Thermal effects destabilize a homogeneous discharge electron and ion diffusion stabilizes it.

== Applications ==
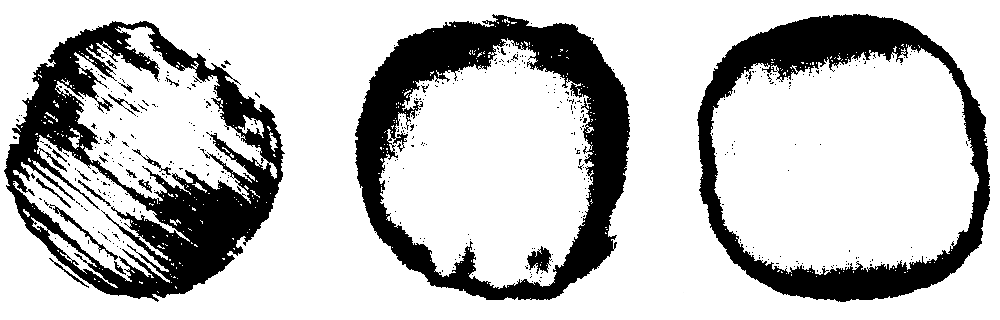
The Gaussian beam photographic paper burn comparison of a carbon dioxide TEA laser, obtained during the optimization process by adjusting the alignment mirrors.

TEA CO_{2} lasers are used extensively for product marking. A logo, serial number or best-before dated is marked on to a variety of packaging materials by passing the laser light through a mask containing the information, and focusing it down to an intensity which ablates the material to be marked. Beside this TEA CO_{2} lasers are used for surface preparation in industrial environments since the mid 1990s. Applications include:

- The selective or complete paint stripping, known as selective laser coating removal (SLCR) in the field of Aircraft maintenance or repair; this selective stripping process was approved in 2001 as the first laser stripping process by OEM’s and Aircraft maintenance centres.
- The activation or cleaning of surfaces for painting and gluing.
- The removal of contamination or coating layers, as preparation for bonding or welding.
- Wear free cleaning of moulds and tools, e.g. tire moulds or moulds to produce skins for automotive interior parts.

The advantage of this specific laser is the combination of the CO_{2} specific wavelength, mainly 10.6 μm, with the high energy level of the short pulses (~2 μs).

== In sociology of scientific knowledge ==
The development of the TEA laser and the replication of building it at other research laboratories was researched by the sociologist Harry Collins. He analyzed how, rather than being able to build the laser from published sources alone, the researchers depended on phone calls and in-person laboratory visits to learn the skills needed to build a functioning TEA laser. Nevertheless, when sharing knowledge between each other, scientists also withheld information seen as relevant in the competition between laboratories (Collins 1974). This 1974 paper is considered seminal to introduce the revisited concept of tacit knowledge in sociology and history of science.

== See also ==
- Nitrogen laser
