= Helium–neon laser =

Type of gas laser

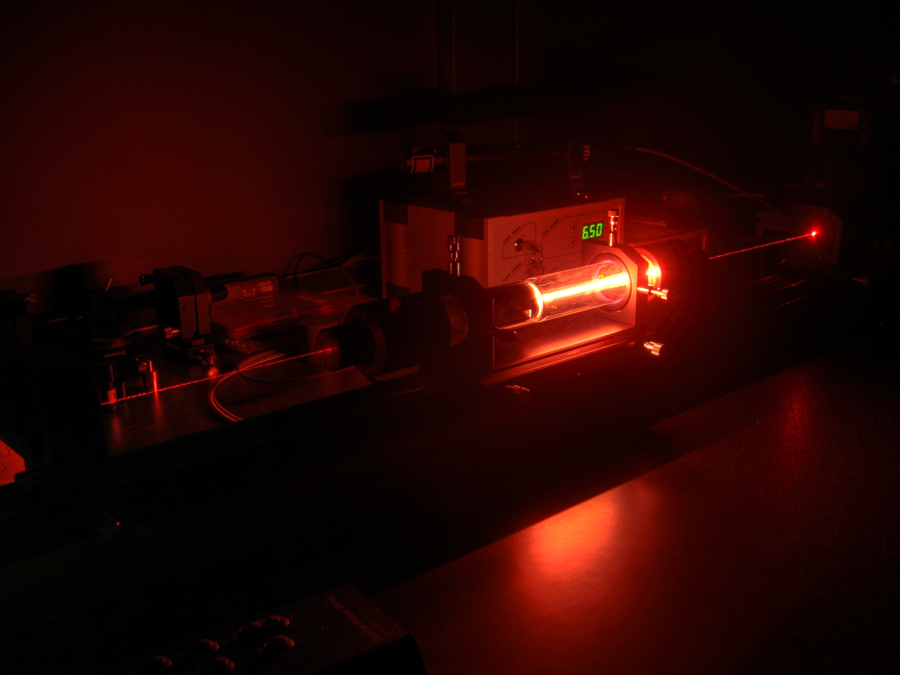
Helium–neon laser at the University of Chemnitz, Germany

A helium–neon laser or He–Ne laser is a type of gas laser whose high energetic gain medium consists of a mixture of helium and neon (ratio between 5:1 and 10:1) at a total pressure of approximately 1 Torr (133.322 Pa) inside a small electrical discharge. The best-known and most widely used He-Ne laser operates at a center wavelength of 632.81646 nm (in air), 632.99138 nm (vac), and frequency 473.6122 THz, in the red part of the visible spectrum. Because of the mode structure of the laser cavity, the instantaneous output of a laser can be shifted by up to 500 MHz in either direction from the center.

== History of He-Ne laser development ==
The first He-Ne lasers emitted infrared at 1150 nm, and were the first gas lasers and the first lasers with continuous wave output. However, a laser that operated at visible wavelengths was much more in demand. A number of other neon transitions were investigated to identify ones in which a population inversion could be achieved. The 633 nm line was found to have the highest gain in the visible spectrum, making this the wavelength of choice for most He-Ne lasers. However, other visible and infrared stimulated-emission wavelengths are possible, and by using mirror coatings with their peak reflectance at these other wavelengths; He-Ne lasers could be engineered to employ those transitions, including visible lasers appearing red, orange, yellow, and green. Stimulated emissions are known from over 100 μm in the far infrared to 540 nm in the visible.

Because visible transitions have somewhat lower gain, these lasers generally have lower output efficiencies and are more costly. The 3.39 μm transition has a very high gain, but is prevented from use in an ordinary He-Ne laser (of a different intended wavelength) because the cavity and mirrors are lossy at that wavelength. However, in high-power He-Ne lasers having a particularly long cavity, superluminescence at 3.39 μm can become a nuisance, robbing power from the stimulated emission medium, often requiring additional suppression.

The best-known and most widely used He-Ne laser operates at a wavelength of 632.8 nm, in the red part of the visible spectrum. It was developed at Bell Telephone Laboratories in 1962, 18 months after the pioneering demonstration at the same laboratory of the first continuous infrared He-Ne gas laser in December 1960.

== Construction and operation ==
The gain medium of the laser, as suggested by its name, is a mixture of helium and neon gases, in approximately a 10:1 ratio, contained at low pressure in a glass envelope. The gas mixture is mostly helium, so that helium atoms can be excited. The excited helium atoms collide with neon atoms, exciting some of them to the state that radiates 632.8 nm. Without helium, the neon atoms would be excited mostly to lower excited states, responsible for non-laser lines.

A neon laser with no helium can be constructed, but it is much more difficult without this means of energy coupling. Therefore, a He-Ne laser that has lost enough of its helium (e.g., due to diffusion through the seals or glass) will lose its laser functionality because the pumping efficiency will be too low. The energy or pump source of the laser is provided by a high-voltage electrical discharge passed through the gas between electrodes (anode and cathode) within the tube. A DC current of 3 to 20 mA is typically required for CW operation. The optical cavity of the laser usually consists of two concave mirrors or one plane and one concave mirror: one having very high (typically 99.9%) reflectance, and the output coupler mirror allowing approximately 1% transmission.

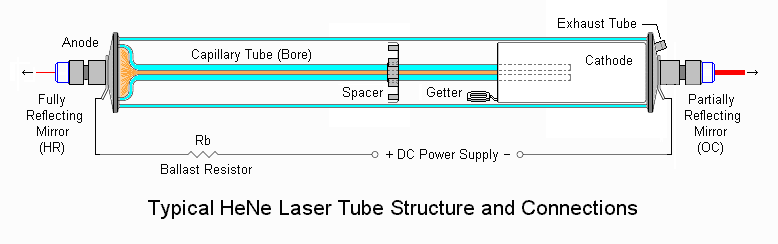
Schematic diagram of a typical 2-3 mW red (633 nm) helium–neon laser tube

Commercial He-Ne lasers are relatively small devices compared to other gas lasers, having cavity lengths usually ranging from 15 to 50 cm (but sometimes up to about 1 meter to achieve the highest powers), and optical output power levels ranging from 0.5 to 50 mW.

The precise wavelength of red He-Ne lasers is 632.991 nm in a vacuum, which is refracted to about 632.816 nm in air. The wavelengths of the stimulated emission modes lie within about 0.001 nm above or below this value, and the wavelengths of those modes shift within this range due to thermal expansion and contraction of the cavity. Frequency-stabilized versions enable the wavelength of a single mode to be specified to within 1 part in 10^{8} by the technique of comparing the powers of two longitudinal modes in opposite polarizations. Absolute stabilization of the laser's frequency (or wavelength) as fine as 2.5 parts in 10^{11} can be obtained through use of an iodine absorption cell.

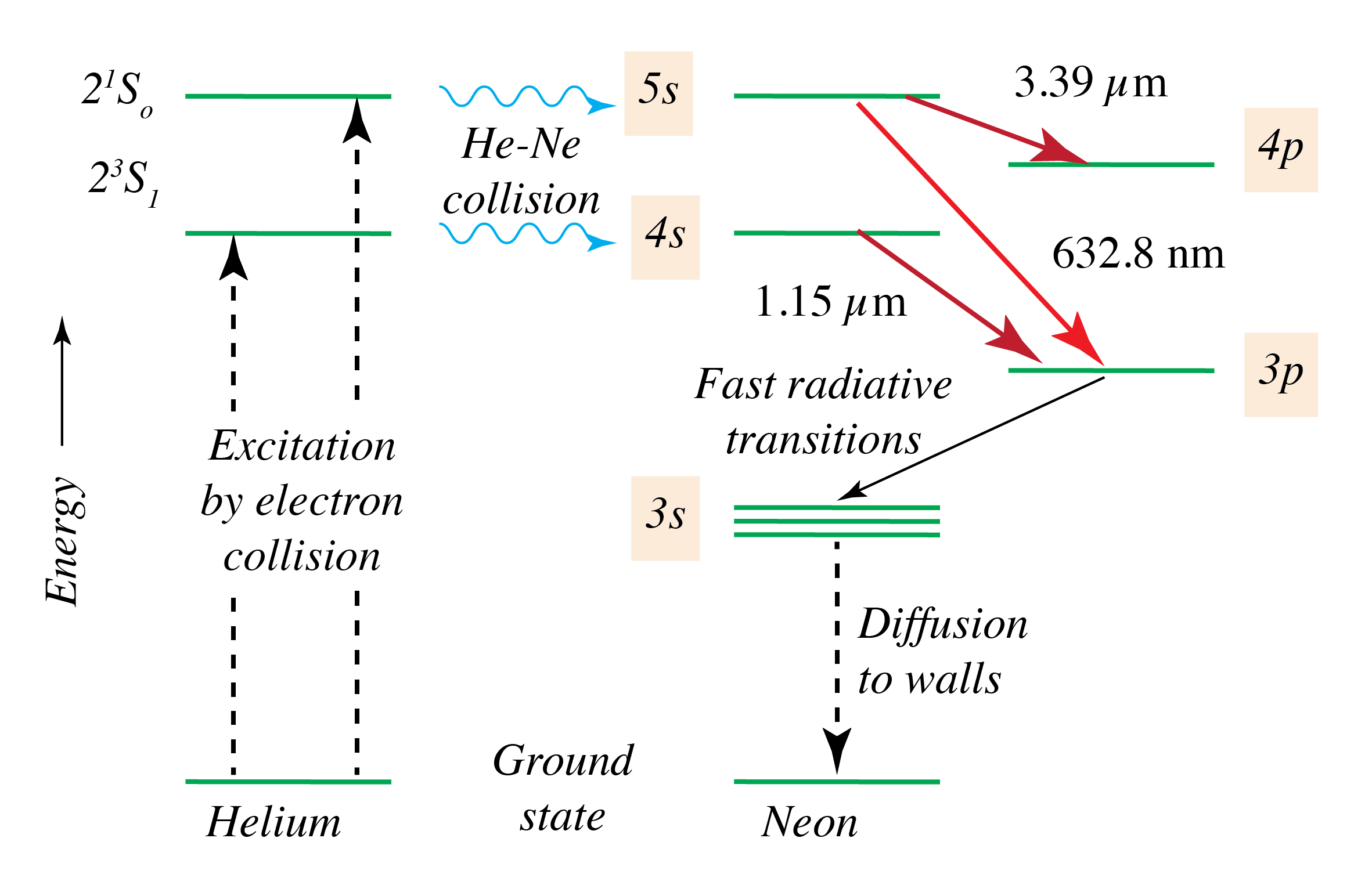
Energy levels in a He-Ne Laser

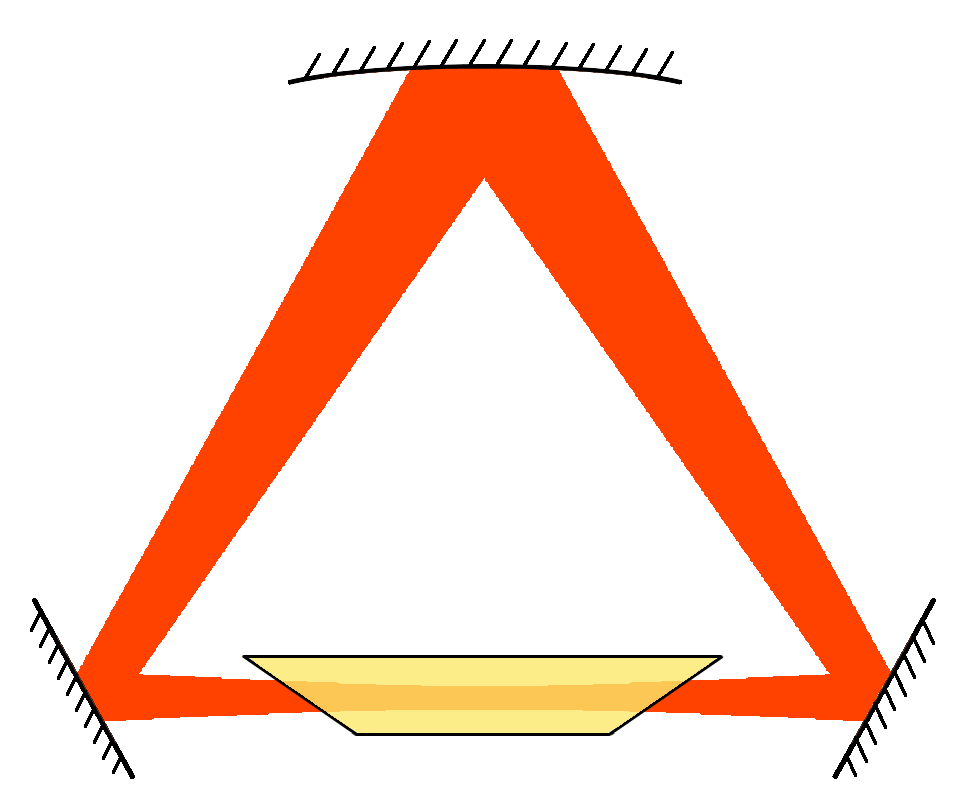
Ring He-Ne Laser

The mechanism producing population inversion and light amplification in a He-Ne laser plasma originates with inelastic collision of energetic electrons with ground-state helium atoms in the gas mixture. As shown in the accompanying energy-level diagram, these collisions excite helium atoms from the ground state to higher energy excited states, among them the 2^{3}S_{1} and 2^{1}S_{0} (LS, or Russell–Saunders coupling, front number 2 indicates that an excited electron is n = 2 state) are long-lived metastable states. Because of a fortuitous near-coincidence between the energy levels of the two He metastable states and the 5s_{2} and 4s_{2} (Paschen notation) levels of neon, collisions between these helium metastable atoms and ground-state neon atoms results in a selective and efficient transfer of excitation energy from the helium to neon. This excitation energy transfer process is given by the reaction equations

He*(2^{3}S_{1}) + Ne^{1}S_{0} → He(^{1}S_{0}) + Ne*4s_{2} + ΔE,
He*(2^{1}S) + Ne^{1}S_{0} + ΔE → He(^{1}S_{0}) + Ne*5s_{2},

where * represents an excited state, and ΔE is the small energy difference between the energy states of the two atoms, of the order of 0.05 eV, or 387 cm^{−1}, which is supplied by kinetic energy. Excitation-energy transfer increases the population of the neon 4s_{2} and 5s_{2} levels manyfold. When the population of these two upper levels exceeds that of the corresponding lower level, 3p_{4}, to which they are optically connected, population inversion is present. The medium becomes capable of amplifying light in a narrow band at 1.15 μm (corresponding to the 4s_{2} to 3p_{4} transition) and in a narrow band at 632.8 nm (corresponding to the 5s_{2} to 3p_{4} transition). The 3p_{4} level is efficiently emptied by fast radiative decay to the 3s state, eventually reaching the ground state.

The remaining step in utilizing optical amplification to create an optical oscillator is to place highly reflecting mirrors at each end of the amplifying medium so that a wave in a particular spatial mode will reflect back upon itself, gaining more power in each pass than is lost due to transmission through the mirrors and diffraction. When these conditions are met for one or more longitudinal modes, then radiation in those modes will rapidly build up until gain saturation occurs, resulting in a stable continuous laser-beam output through the front (typically 99% reflecting) mirror.

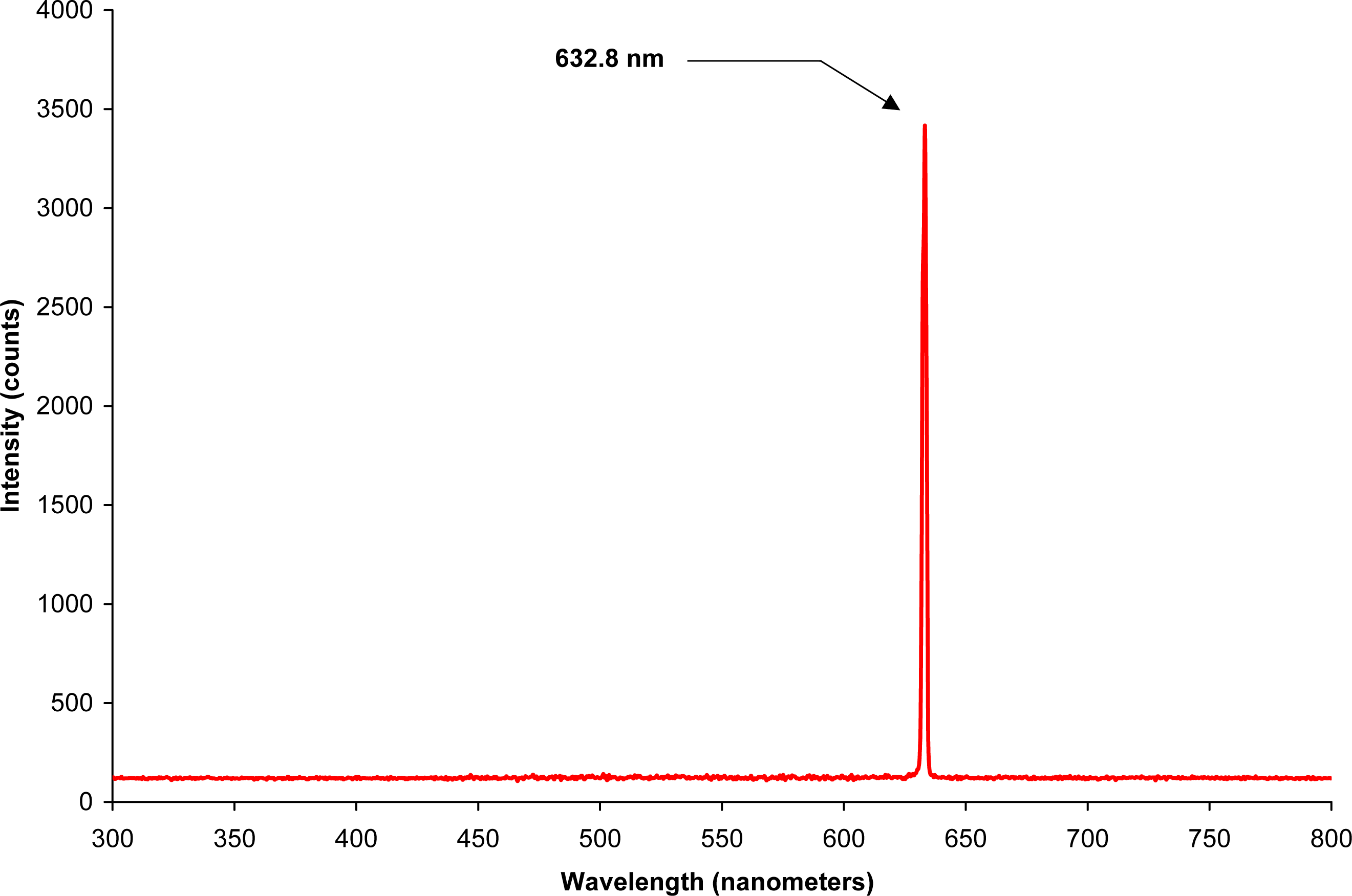
Spectrum of a helium–neon laser illustrating its very high spectral purity (limited by the measuring apparatus). The 0.002 nm bandwidth of the stimulated emission medium is well over 10000 times narrower than the spectral width of a light-emitting diode (see its spectrum for comparison), with the bandwidth of a single longitudinal mode being much narrower still.

The gain bandwidth of the He-Ne laser is dominated by Doppler broadening rather than pressure broadening due to the low gas pressure and is thus quite narrow: only about 1.5 GHz full width for the 633 nm transition. With cavities having typical lengths of 15 to 50 cm, this allows about 2 to 8 longitudinal modes to oscillate simultaneously (however, single-longitudinal-mode units are available for special applications). The visible output of the red He-Ne laser, long coherence length, and its excellent spatial quality, makes this laser a useful source for holography and as a wavelength reference for spectroscopy. A stabilized He-Ne laser is also one of the benchmark systems for the definition of the meter.

Prior to the invention of cheap, abundant diode lasers, red He-Ne lasers were widely used in barcode scanners at supermarket checkout counters. He-Ne lasers are generally present in educational and research optical laboratories. They are also unsurpassed for use in nano-positioning in applications such as semiconductor device fabrication. High precision laser gyroscopes have employed He-Ne lasers operating at 633 nm in a ring laser configuration.

== Applications ==
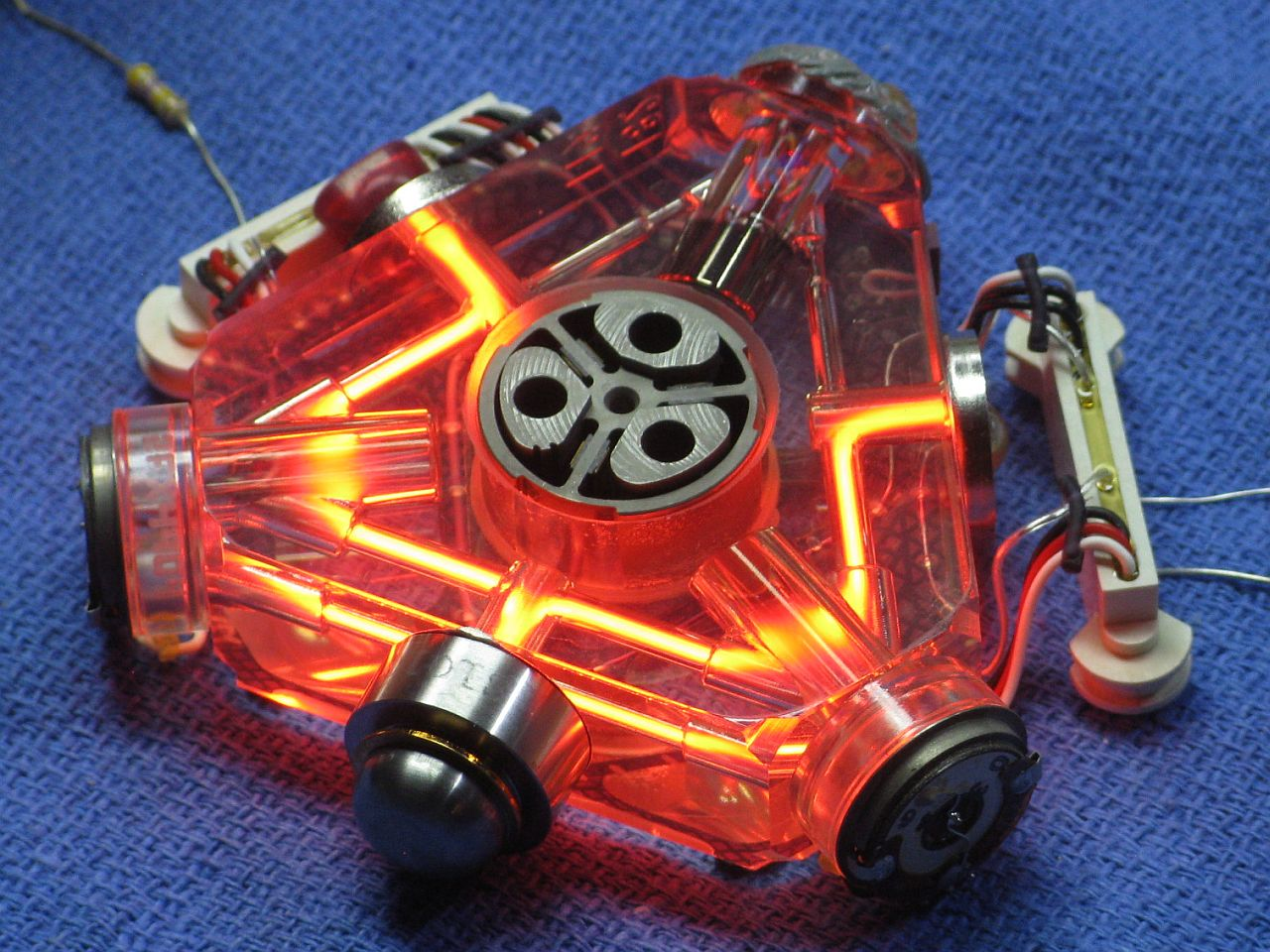
Solid glass-ceramic block core of the Honeywell GG1320 Ring Laser Gyro used for primary navigation in many commercial aircraft and elsewhere.

Red He-Ne lasers have an enormous number of industrial and scientific uses. They are widely used in laboratory demonstrations in the field of optics because of their relatively low cost and ease of operation compared to other visible lasers producing beams of similar quality in terms of spatial coherence (a single-mode Gaussian beam) and long coherence length (however, since about 1990 semiconductor lasers have offered a lower-cost alternative for many such applications).

Starting in 1978, HeNe tube lasers (manufactured by Toshiba and NEC) were used in LaserDisc players from Pioneer. This continued until the 1984 model lineup, which contained infrared laser diodes instead. Pioneer continued to use laser diodes in all LaserDisc players afterwards until LaserDisc was discontinued in 2009.

== See also ==
- List of laser types
- Argon gas
