= Carbon-dioxide laser =

Form of gas laser

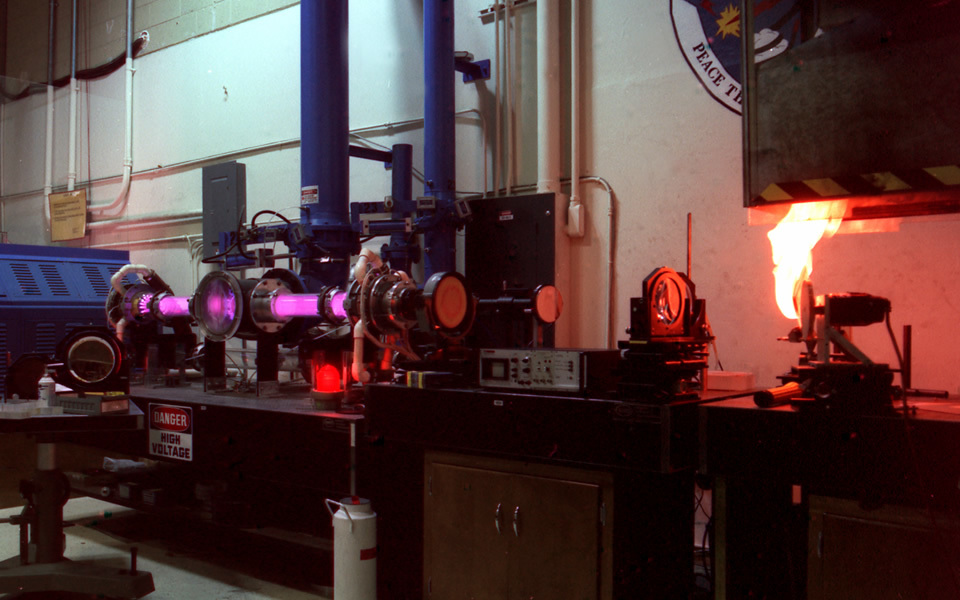
A test target bursts into flame upon irradiation by a continuous-wave kilowatt-level carbon-dioxide laser.

The carbon-dioxide laser (CO_{2} laser) was one of the earliest gas lasers to be developed. It was invented by Kumar Patel of Bell Labs in 1964 and is still one of the most useful types of laser. Carbon-dioxide lasers are the highest-power continuous-wave lasers that are currently available. They are also quite efficient: the ratio of output power to pump power can be as large as 20%. The CO_{2} laser produces a beam of infrared light with the principal wavelength bands centering on 9.6 and 10.6 micrometers (μm).

== Amplification ==
The active laser medium (laser gain/amplification medium) is a gas discharge which is air- or water-cooled, depending on the power being applied. The filling gas within a sealed discharge tube consists of around 10–20% carbon dioxide (CO_{2}), around 10–20% nitrogen (N_{2}), a few percent hydrogen (H_{2}) and/or xenon (Xe), with the remainder being helium (He). A different mixture is used in a flow-through laser, where CO_{2} is continuously pumped through it. The specific proportions vary according to the particular laser.

The population inversion in the laser is achieved by the following sequence: electron impact excites the {v1(1)} quantum vibrational modes of nitrogen. Because nitrogen is a homonuclear molecule, it cannot lose this energy by photon emission, and its excited vibrational modes are therefore metastable and relatively long-lived. N_{2}{v1(1)} and CO_{2}{v3(1)} being nearly perfectly resonant (total molecular energy differential is within 3 cm^{−1} when accounting for N_{2} anharmonicity, centrifugal distortion and vibro-rotational interaction, which is more than made up for by the Maxwell speed distribution of translational-mode energy), N_{2} collisionally de-excites by transferring its vibrational mode energy to the CO_{2} molecule, causing the carbon dioxide to excite to its {v3(1)} (asymmetric stretch) vibrational mode quantum state. The CO_{2} then radiatively emits at either 10.6 μm (Note: The exact wavelength depends upon the isotopic composition of the CO_{2} molecule.) by dropping to the {v1(1)} (symmetric-stretch) vibrational mode, or 9.6 μm by dropping to the {v20(2)} (bending) vibrational mode. The carbon dioxide molecules then transition to their {v20(0)} vibrational mode ground state from {v1(1)} or {v20(2)} by collision with cold helium atoms, thus maintaining population inversion. The resulting hot helium atoms must be cooled in order to sustain the ability to produce a population inversion in the carbon dioxide molecules. In sealed lasers, this takes place as the helium atoms strike the walls of the laser discharge tube. In flow-through lasers, a continuous stream of CO_{2} and nitrogen is excited by the plasma discharge and the hot gas mixture is exhausted from the resonator by pumps.

The addition of helium also plays a role in the initial vibrational excitation of N_{2}, due to a near-resonant dissociation reaction with metastable He(2^{3}S_{1}). Substituting helium with other noble gases, such as neon or argon, does not lead to an enhancement of laser output.

Because the excitation energy of molecular vibrational and rotational mode quantum states are low, the photons emitted due to transition between these quantum states have comparatively lower energy, and longer wavelength, than visible and near-infrared light. The 9–12 μm wavelength of CO_{2} lasers is useful because it falls into an important window for atmospheric transmission (up to 80% atmospheric transmission at this wavelength), and because many natural and synthetic materials have strong characteristic absorption in this range.

The laser wavelength can be tuned by altering the isotopic ratio of the carbon and oxygen atoms comprising the CO_{2} molecules in the discharge tube.

== Construction ==
Because CO_{2} lasers operate in the infrared, special materials are necessary for their construction. Typically, the mirrors are silvered, while windows and lenses are made of either germanium or zinc selenide. For high power applications, gold mirrors and zinc selenide windows and lenses are preferred. There are also diamond windows and lenses in use. Diamond windows are extremely expensive, but their high thermal conductivity and hardness make them useful in high-power applications and in dirty environments. Optical elements made of diamond can even be sand blasted without losing their optical properties. Historically, lenses and windows were made out of salt (either sodium chloride or potassium chloride). While the material was inexpensive, the lenses and windows degraded slowly with exposure to atmospheric moisture.

The most basic form of a CO_{2} laser consists of a gas discharge (with a mix close to that specified above) with a total reflector at one end, and an output coupler (a partially reflecting mirror) at the output end.

The CO_{2} laser can be constructed to have continuous wave (CW) powers between milliwatts (mW) and hundreds of kilowatts (kW). It is also very easy to actively Q-switch a CO_{2} laser by means of a rotating mirror or an electro-optic switch, giving rise to Q-switched peak powers of up to gigawatts (GW).

Because the laser transitions are actually on vibration-rotation bands of a linear triatomic molecule, the rotational structure of the P and R bands can be selected by a tuning element in the laser cavity. Prisms are not practical as tuning elements because most media that transmit in the mid-infrared absorb or scatter some of the light, so the frequency tuning element is almost always a diffraction grating. By rotating the diffraction grating, a particular rotational line of the vibrational transition can be selected. The finest frequency selection may also be obtained through the use of an etalon. In practice, together with isotopic substitution, this means that a continuous comb of frequencies separated by around 1 cm^{−1} (30 GHz) can be used that extend from 880 to 1090 cm^{−1}. Such "line-tuneable" carbon-dioxide lasers are principally of interest in research applications. The laser's output wavelength is affected by the particular isotopes contained in the carbon dioxide molecule, with heavier isotopes causing longer wavelength emission.

== Applications ==
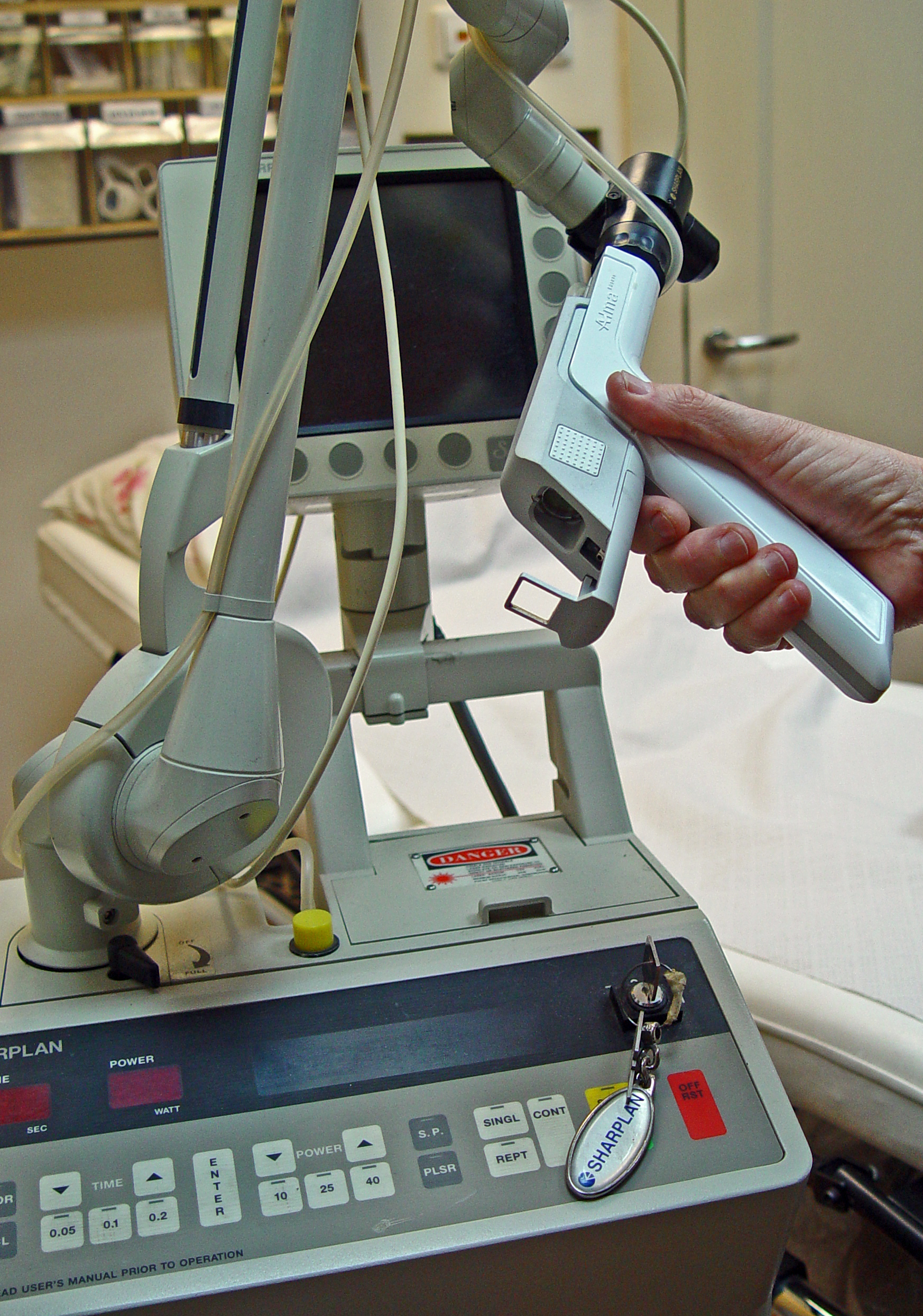
A medical CO_{2} laser

=== Industrial (cutting and welding) ===
Because of the high power levels available (combined with reasonable cost for the laser), CO_{2} lasers are frequently used in industrial applications for cutting and welding, while lower power level lasers are used for engraving. In selective laser sintering, CO_{2} lasers are used to fuse particles of plastic powder into parts.

=== Medical (soft-tissue surgery) ===
Carbon-dioxide lasers have become useful in surgical procedures because water (which makes up most biological tissue) absorbs this frequency of light very well. Some examples of medical uses are laser surgery and skin resurfacing ("laser facelifts", which essentially consist of vaporizing the skin to promote collagen formation). CO_{2} lasers may be used to treat certain skin conditions such as hirsuties papillaris genitalis by removing bumps or podules. CO_{2} lasers can be used to remove vocal-fold lesions, such as vocal-fold cysts. Researchers in Israel are experimenting with using CO_{2} lasers to weld human tissue, as an alternative to traditional sutures.

The 10.6 μm CO_{2} laser remains the best surgical laser for the soft tissue where both cutting and hemostasis are achieved photo-thermally (radiantly). CO_{2} lasers can be used in place of a scalpel for most procedures and are even used in places a scalpel would not be used, in delicate areas where mechanical trauma could damage the surgical site. CO_{2} lasers are the best suited for soft-tissue procedures in human and animal specialties, as compared to laser with other wavelengths. Advantages include less bleeding, shorter surgery time, less risk of infection, and less post-op swelling. Applications include gynecology, dentistry, oral and maxillofacial surgery, and many others. In veterinary medicine, 10.6 μm CO_{2} lasers are utilized for a variety of soft-tissue procedures, including onychectomy, neutering, spaying, oncological tumor removals, and specialized ophthalmic, aural, and dermatological surgeries.

A CO_{2} dental laser at the 9.25–9.6 μm wavelength is sometimes used in dentistry for hard-tissue ablation. The hard-tissue is ablated at temperatures as high as 5,000 °C, producing bright thermal radiation.

=== Other ===
The common plastic poly (methyl methacrylate) (PMMA) absorbs IR light in the 2.8–25 μm wavelength band, so CO_{2} lasers have been used in recent years for fabricating microfluidic devices from it, with channel widths of a few hundred micrometers.

Because the atmosphere is quite transparent to infrared light, CO_{2} lasers are also used for military rangefinding using LIDAR techniques.

CO_{2} lasers are used in spectroscopy and the Silex process to enrich uranium.

In semiconductor manufacturing, CO_{2} lasers are used for extreme ultraviolet generation.

The Soviet Polyus was designed to use a megawatt carbon-dioxide laser as an in-orbit weapon to destroy SDI satellites.

== See also ==
- Beam homogenizer
- Laser beam profiler
- TEA laser
