= List of laser applications =

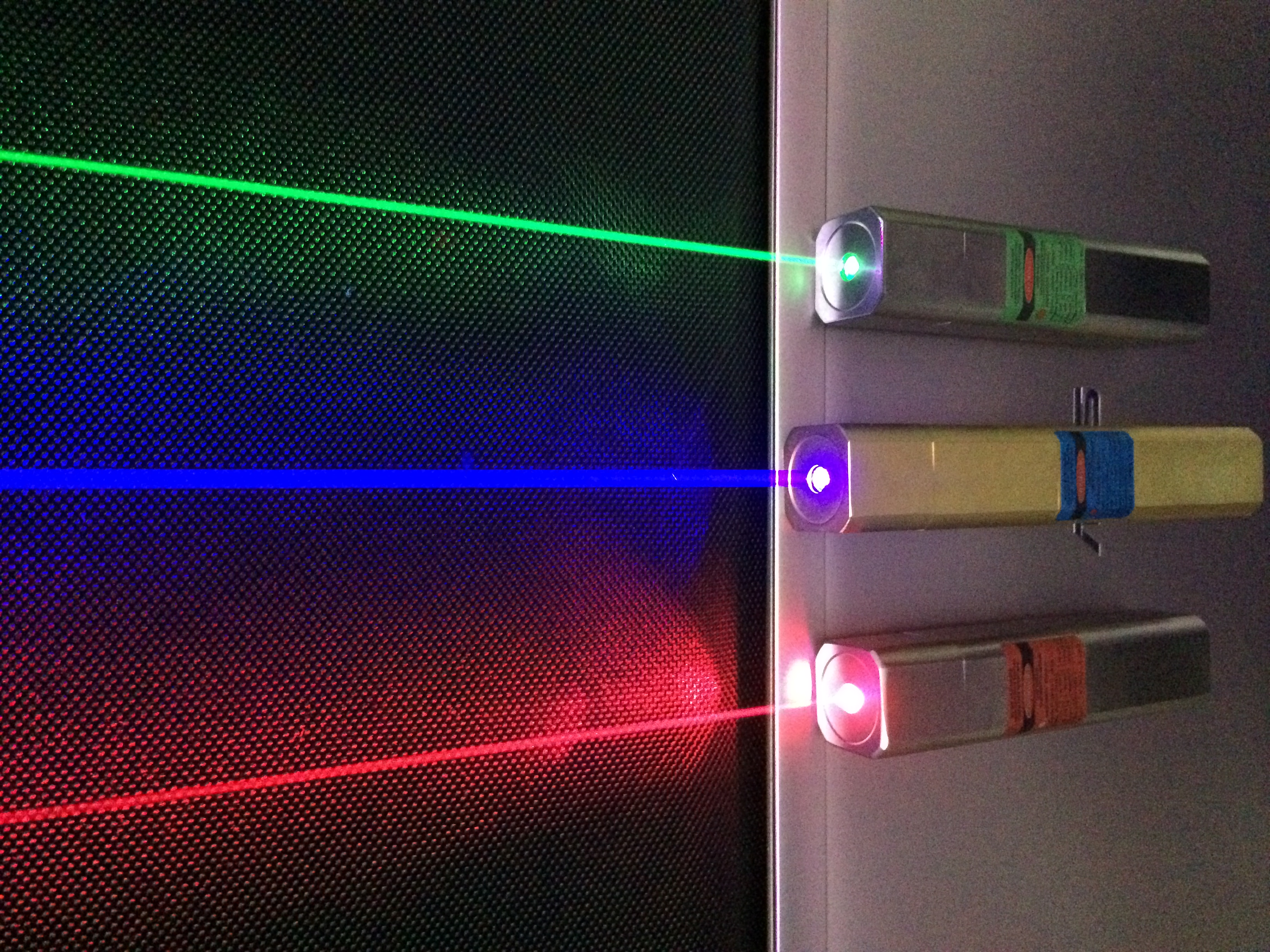
Laser pointers in different colours

Many scientific, military, medical and commercial laser applications have been developed since the invention of the laser in 1958. The coherency, high monochromaticity, and ability to reach extremely high powers are all properties which allow for these specialized applications.

== Scientific ==
In science, lasers are used in many ways, including:

- A wide variety of interferometric techniques
- Raman spectroscopy
- Laser induced breakdown spectroscopy
- Atmospheric remote sensing
- Investigating nonlinear optics phenomena
- Holographic techniques employing lasers also contribute to a number of measurement techniques.
- Laser based lidar (LIght raDAR) technology applications in geology, seismology, remote sensing and atmospheric physics.
- Three-dimensional structural modifications and writing inside technological materials.
- Lasers have been used aboard spacecraft such as in the Cassini-Huygens mission.
- In astronomy, lasers have been used to create artificial laser guide stars, used as reference objects for adaptive optics telescopes.

Lasers may also be indirectly used in spectroscopy as a micro-sampling system, a technique termed Laser ablation (LA), which is typically applied to ICP-MS apparatus resulting in the powerful LA-ICP-MS.

The principles of laser spectroscopy are discussed by Demtröder.

=== Spectroscopy ===
Most types of laser are an inherently pure source of light; they emit near-monochromatic light with a very well defined range of wavelengths. By careful design of the laser components, the purity of the laser light (measured as the "linewidth") can be improved more than the purity of any other light source. This makes the laser a very useful source for spectroscopy. The high intensity of light that can be achieved in a small, well collimated beam can also be used to induce a nonlinear optical effect in a sample, which makes techniques such as Raman spectroscopy possible. Other spectroscopic techniques based on lasers can be used to make extremely sensitive detectors of various molecules, able to measure molecular concentrations in the parts-per-10^{12} (ppt) level. Due to the high power densities achievable by lasers, beam-induced atomic emission is possible: this technique is termed Laser induced breakdown spectroscopy (LIBS).

=== Heat treatment ===
Heat treating with the lasers allows selective surface hardening against wear with little or no distortion of the component. Because this eliminates much part reworking that is currently done, the laser system's capital cost is recovered in a short time. An inert, absorbent coating for laser heat treatment has also been developed that eliminates the fumes generated by conventional paint coatings during the heat-treating process with CO_{2} laser beams.

One consideration crucial to the success of a heat treatment operation is control of the laser beam irradiance on the part surface. The optimal irradiance distribution is driven by the thermodynamics of the laser-material interaction and by the part geometry.

Typically, irradiances between 500 and 5000 W/cm^2 satisfy the thermodynamic constraints and allow the rapid surface heating and minimal total heat input required. For general heat treatment, a uniform square or rectangular beam is one of the best options. For some special applications or applications where the heat treatment is done on an edge or corner of the part, it may be better to have the irradiance decrease near the edge to prevent melting.

=== Weather ===
Research shows that scientists may one day be able to induce rain and lightning storms (as well as micro-manipulating some other weather phenomena) using high energy lasers. Such a breakthrough could potentially eradicate droughts, help alleviate weather related catastrophes, and allocate weather resources to areas in need.

=== Lunar laser ranging ===
When the Apollo astronauts visited the Moon, they planted retroreflector arrays to make possible the Lunar Laser Ranging Experiment. Laser beams are focused through large telescopes on Earth aimed toward the arrays, and the time taken for the beam to be reflected back to Earth measured to determine the distance between the Earth and Moon with high accuracy.

=== Photochemistry ===
Some laser systems, through the process of mode locking, can produce extremely brief pulses of light - as short as picoseconds or femtoseconds (10^{−12} - 10^{−15} seconds). Such pulses can be used to initiate and analyze chemical reactions, a technique known as photochemistry. The short pulses can be used to probe the process of the reaction at a very high temporal resolution, allowing the detection of short-lived intermediate molecules. This method is particularly useful in biochemistry, where it is used to analyse details of protein folding and function.

=== Laser scanner ===
Laser barcode scanners are ideal for applications that require high speed reading of linear codes or stacked symbols.

=== Laser cooling ===
A technique that has recent success is laser cooling. This involves atom trapping, a method where a number of atoms are confined in a specially shaped arrangement of electric and magnetic fields. Shining particular wavelengths of light at the ions or atoms slows them down, thus cooling them. As this process is continued, they all are slowed and have the same energy level, forming an unusual arrangement of matter known as a Bose–Einstein condensate.

=== Nuclear fusion ===
Some of the world's most powerful and complex arrangements of multiple lasers and optical amplifiers are used to produce extremely high intensity pulses of light of extremely short duration, e.g. laboratory for laser energetics, National Ignition Facility, GEKKO XII, Nike laser, Laser Mégajoule, HiPER. These pulses are arranged such that they impact pellets of tritium–deuterium simultaneously from all directions, hoping that the squeezing effect of the impacts will induce atomic fusion in the pellets. This technique, known as "inertial confinement fusion", so far has not been able to achieve "breakeven", that is, so far the fusion reaction generates less power than is used to power the lasers, however; experiments at the National Ignition Facility were able to demonstrate fusion reactions that generate more energy than was contained within the lasers driving the reaction.

=== Particle acceleration ===
Powerful lasers producing ultra-short (in the tens of femtoseconds) and ultra-intense (up to 10^{23} W/cm^{2}) laser pulses offer much greater acceleration gradients than that of conventional accelerators. This fact is exploited in several plasma acceleration techniques used for accelerating both electrons and charged ions to high energies.

=== Microscopy ===
Confocal laser scanning microscopy and Two-photon excitation microscopy make use of lasers to obtain blur-free images of thick specimens at various depths. Laser capture microdissection use lasers to procure specific cell populations from a tissue section under microscopic visualization.

Additional laser microscopy techniques include harmonic microscopy, four-wave mixing microscopy and interferometric microscopy.

== Military ==
=== Directly as an energy weapon ===
A laser weapon is directed-energy weapon based on lasers.

=== Defensive countermeasures ===
Defensive countermeasure applications can range from compact, low power infrared countermeasures to high power, airborne laser systems. IR countermeasure systems use lasers to confuse the seeker heads on infrared homing missiles.

=== Disorientation ===
Some weapons simply use a laser to disorient a person. One such weapon is the Thales Green Laser Optical Warner.

=== Guidance ===
Laser guidance is a technique of guiding a missile or other projectile or vehicle to a target by means of a laser beam.

=== Target designator ===
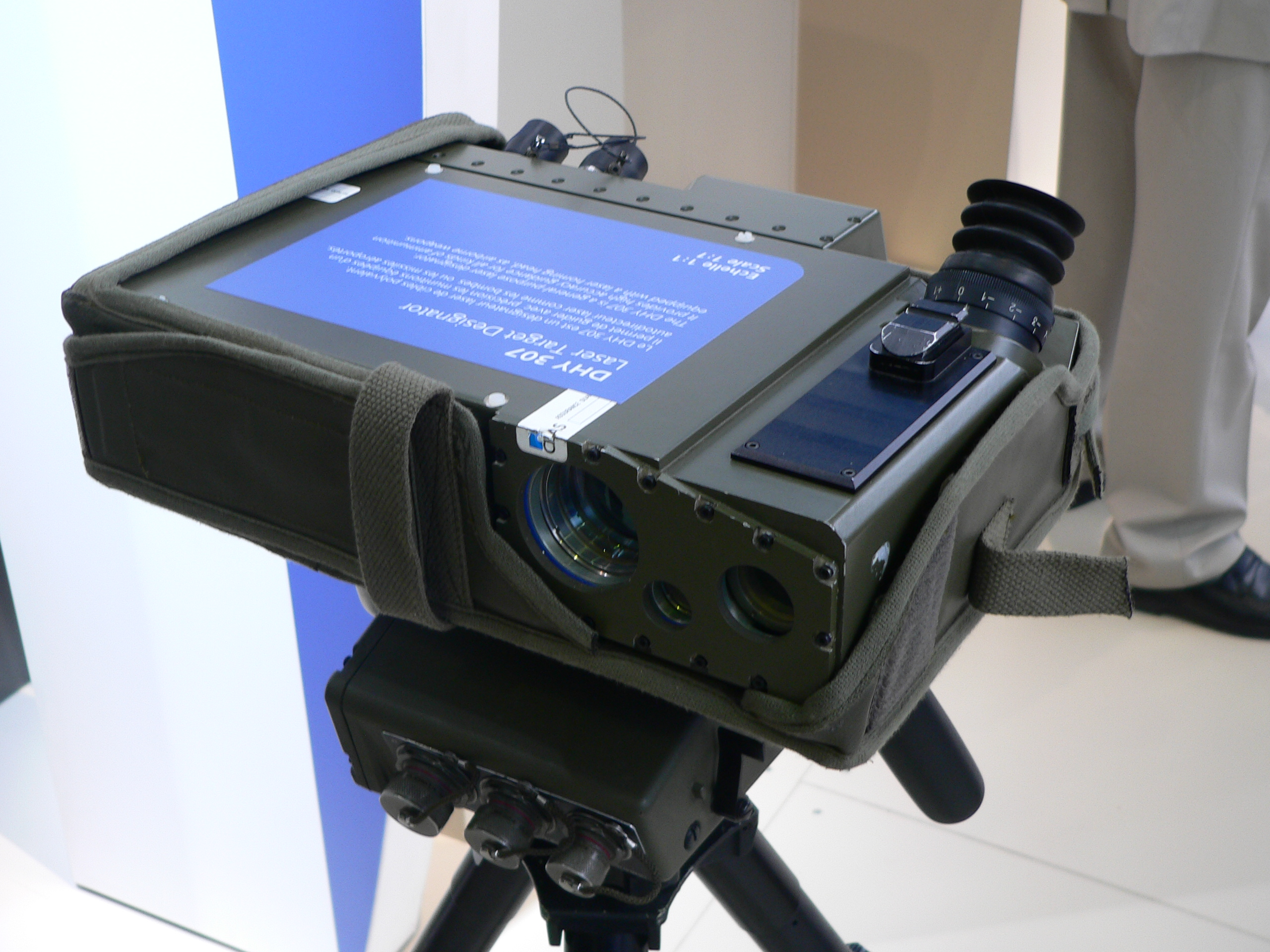
A target designator

Another military use of lasers is as a laser target designator. This is a low-power laser pointer used to indicate a target for a precision-guided munition, typically launched from an aircraft. The guided munition adjusts its flight-path to home in to the laser light reflected by the target, enabling a great precision in aiming. The beam of the laser target designator is set to a pulse rate that matches that set on the guided munition to ensure munitions strike their designated targets and do not follow other laser beams which may be in use in the area. The laser designator can be shone onto the target by an aircraft or nearby infantry. Lasers used for this purpose are usually infrared lasers, so the enemy cannot easily detect the guiding laser light.

=== Firearms ===
==== Laser sight ====
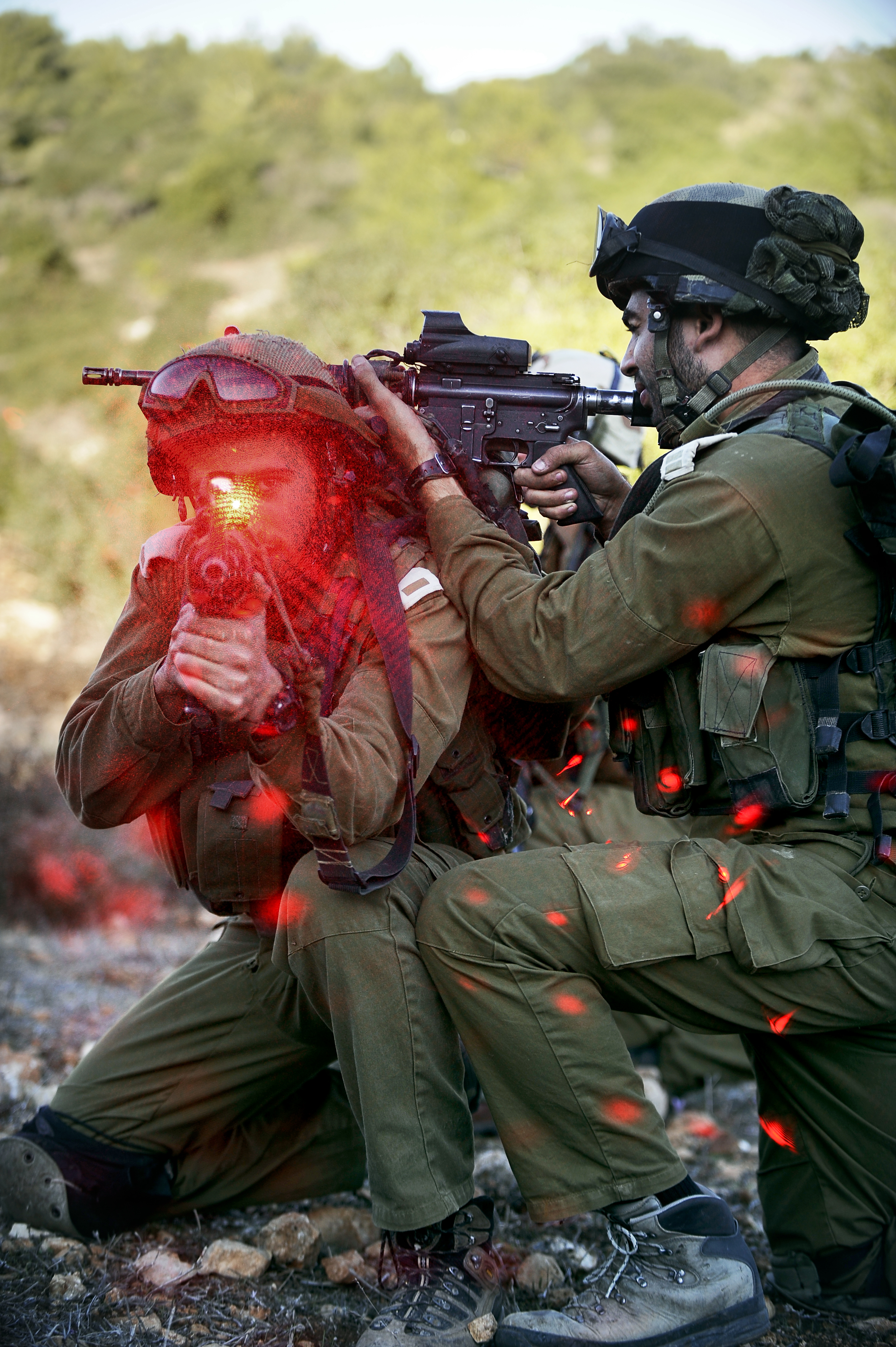
Laser sight used by the Israel Defense Forces during commando training

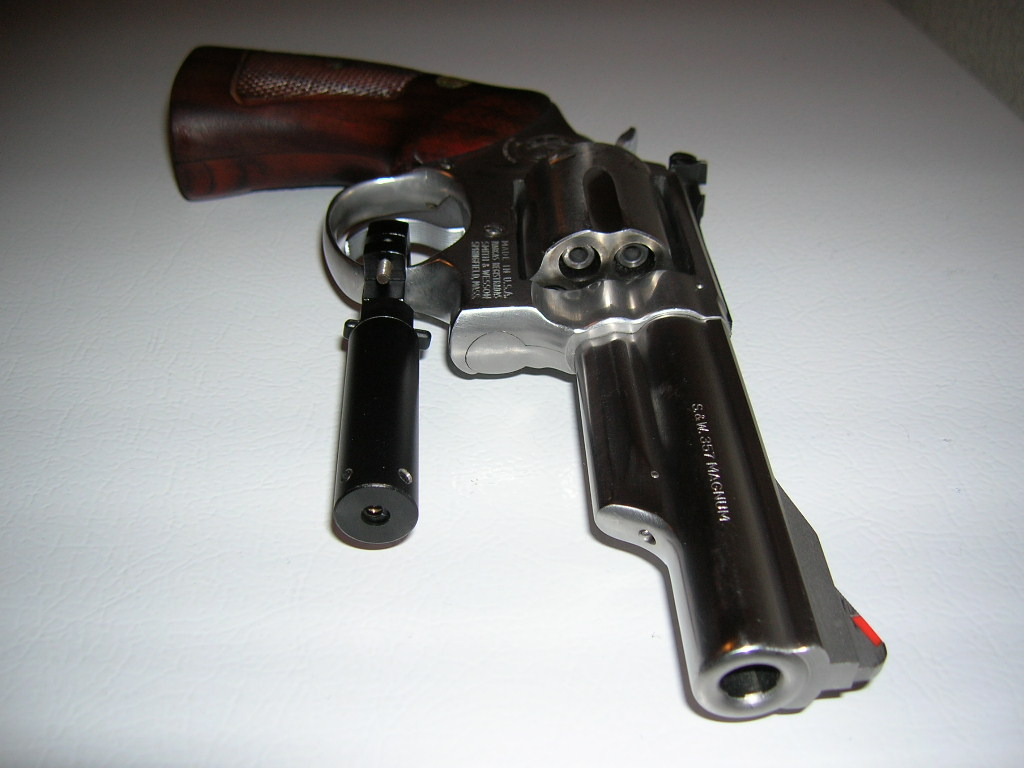
Smith & Wesson revolver equipped with a laser sight mounted on the trigger guard.

The laser has in most firearms applications been used as a tool to enhance the targeting of other weapon systems. For example, a laser sight is a small, usually visible-light laser placed on a handgun or a rifle and aligned to emit a beam parallel to the barrel. Since a laser beam has low divergence, the laser light appears as a small spot even at long distances; the user places the spot on the desired target and the barrel of the gun is aligned (but not necessarily allowing for bullet drop, windage, distance between the direction of the beam and the axis of the barrel, and the target mobility while the bullet travels).

Most laser sights use a red laser diode. Others use an infrared diode to produce a dot invisible to the naked human eye but detectable with night vision devices. The firearms adaptive target acquisition module LLM01 laser light module combines visible and infrared laser diodes. In the late 1990s, green diode pumped solid state laser (DPSS) laser sights (532 nm) became available.

==== Eye-targeted lasers ====
A less-lethal laser weapon was developed by the U.S. Air Force to temporarily impair an adversary's ability to fire a weapon or to otherwise threaten enemy forces. This unit illuminates an opponent with harmless low-power laser light and can have the effect of dazzling or disorienting the subject or causing them to flee. Several types of dazzlers are now available, and some have been used in combat.

There remains the possibility of using lasers to blind, since this requires relatively low power levels and is easily achievable in a man-portable unit. However, most nations regard the deliberate permanent blinding of the enemy as forbidden by the rules of war (see Protocol on Blinding Laser Weapons). Although several nations have developed blinding laser weapons, such as China's ZM-87, none of these are believed to have made it past the prototype stage.

In addition to the applications that cross over with military applications, a widely known law enforcement use of lasers is for lidar to measure the speed of vehicles.

==== Holographic weapon sight ====
A holographic weapon sight uses a laser diode to illuminate a hologram of a reticle built into a flat glass optical window of the sight. The user looks through the optical window and sees a cross hair reticle image superimposed at a distance on the field of view.

== Medical ==
- Cosmetic surgery (removing tattoos, scars, stretch marks, sunspots, wrinkles, birthmarks, and hair): see laser hair removal. Laser types used in dermatology include ruby (694 nm), alexandrite (755 nm), pulsed diode array (810 nm), Nd:YAG (1064 nm), Ho:YAG (2090 nm), and Er:YAG (2940 nm).
- Eye surgery and refractive surgery
- Soft tissue surgery: CO_{2}, Er:YAG laser
- Laser scalpel (General surgery, gynecological, urology, laparoscopic)
- Photobiomodulation (i.e. laser therapy)
- "No-Touch" removal of tumors, especially of the brain and spinal cord.
- In dentistry for caries removal, endodontic/periodontic procedures, tooth whitening, and oral surgery
- Cancer treatment
- Burn and surgical scar management: scar contracture CO_{2} (especially the newer fractionated CO_{2} lasers), redness and itch (Pulsed Dye laser - PDL), post-inflammatory hyper-pigmentation (Q-switched lasers :Ruby, Alexandrite), burn scar unwanted hair growth and trapped hairs (Ruby, IPL and numerous hair removal lasers)

== Industrial and commercial ==
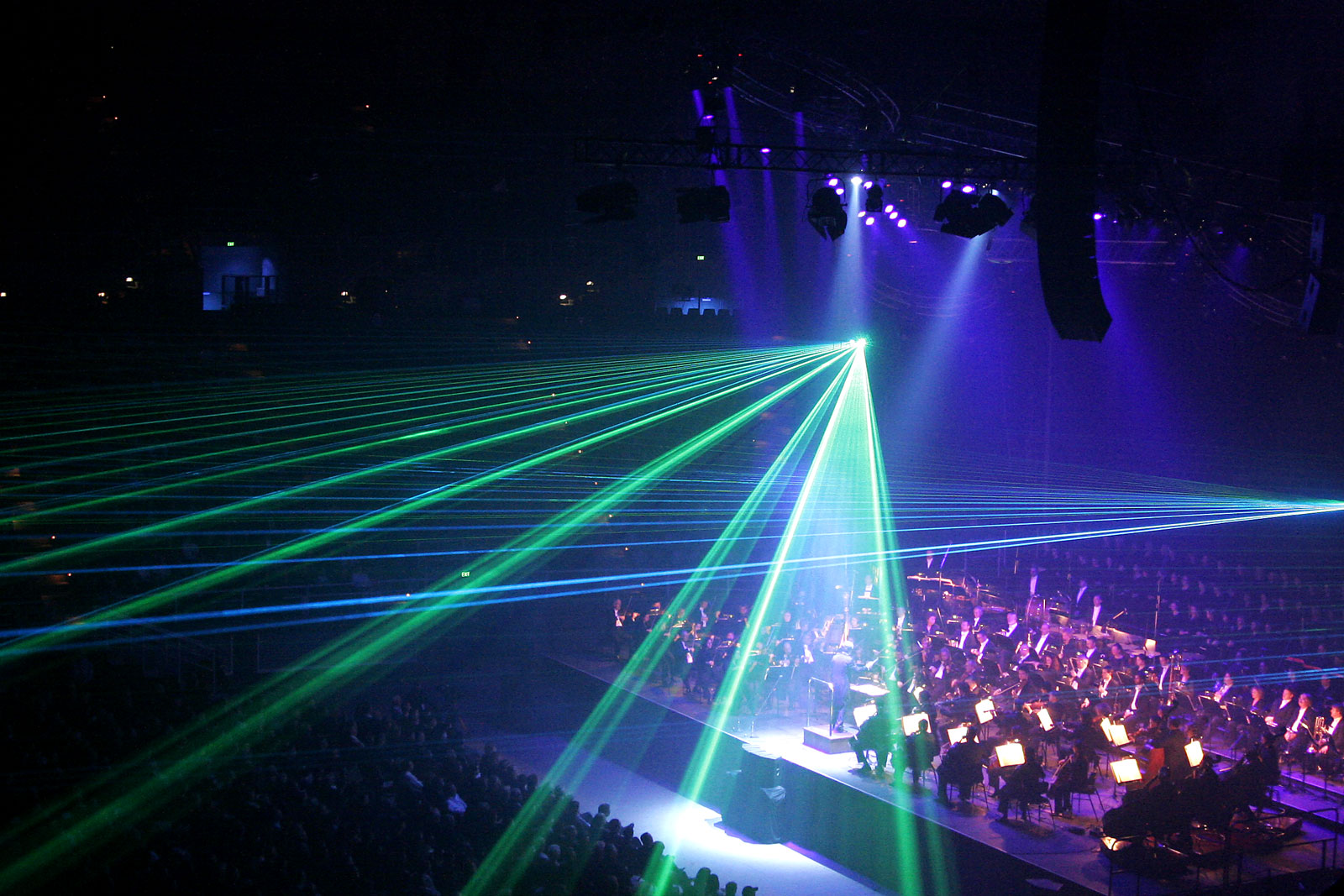
Lasers used for visual effects during a musical performance. (A laser light show.)

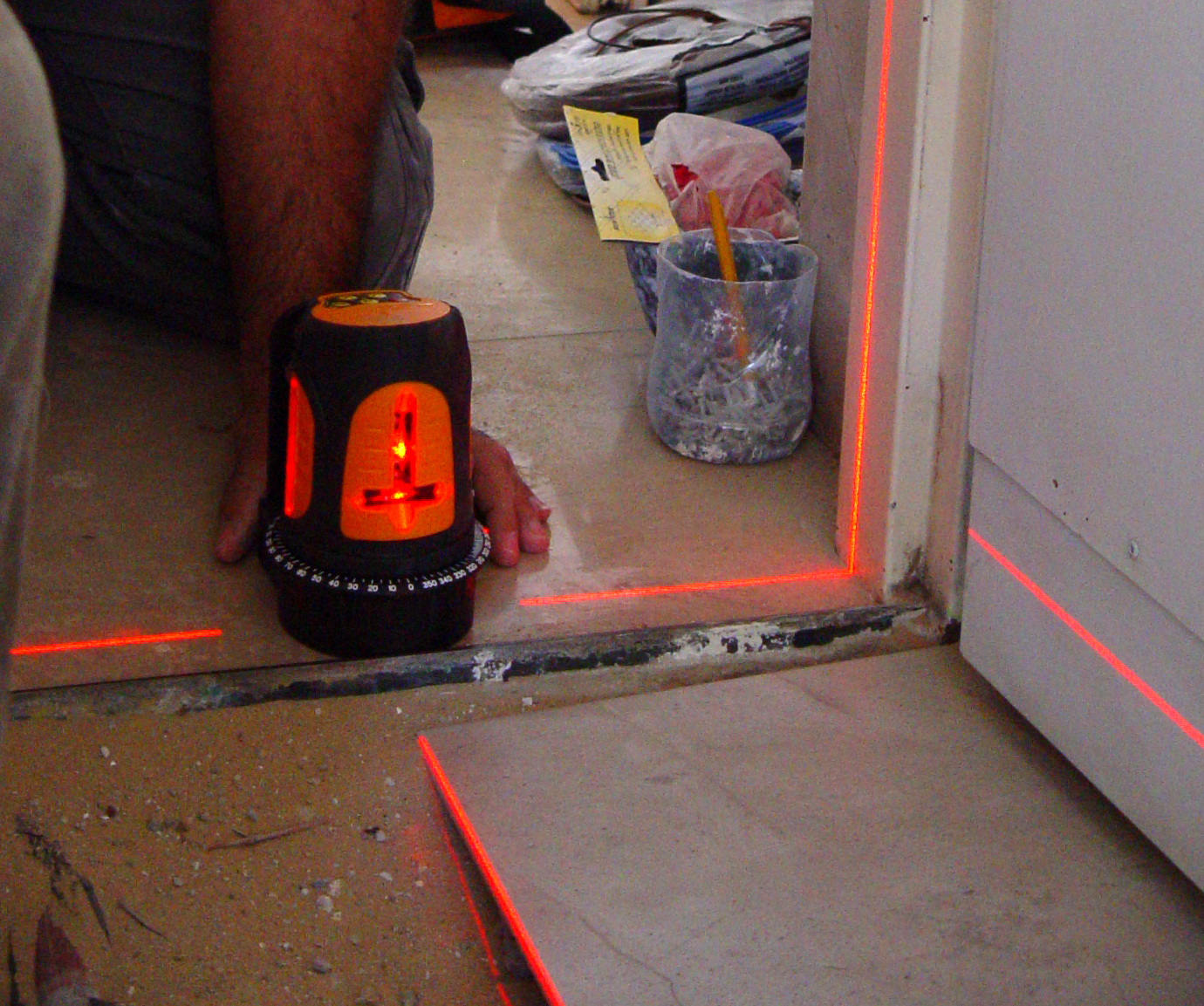
Levelling of ceramic tiles floor with a laser device

Industrial laser applications can be divided into two categories depending on the power of the laser: material processing and micro-material processing.

In material processing, lasers with average optical power above 1 kilowatt are used mainly for industrial materials processing applications. Beyond this power threshold there are thermal issues related to the optics that separate these lasers from their lower-power counterparts. Laser systems in the 50-300W range are used primarily for pumping, plastic welding and soldering applications. Lasers above 300W are used in brazing, thin metal welding, and sheet metal cutting applications. The required brightness (as measured in by the beam parameter product) is higher for cutting applications than for brazing and thin metal welding. High power applications, such as hardening, cladding, and deep penetrating welding, require multiple kW of optical power, and are used in a broad range of industrial processes.

Micro material processing is a category that includes all laser material processing applications under 1 kilowatt. The use of lasers in Micro Materials Processing has found broad application in the development and manufacturing of screens for smartphones, tablet computers, and LED TVs.

A detailed list of industrial and commercial laser applications includes:

- Laser cutting
- Laser welding
- Laser drilling
- Laser marking
- Laser cleaning
- Laser cladding, a surface engineering process applied to mechanical components for reconditioning, repair work or hardfacing
- Photolithography
- Optical communications over optical fiber or in free space
- Laser peening
- Guidance systems (e.g., ring laser gyroscopes)
- Laser rangefinder / surveying,
- Lidar / pollution monitoring,
- Digital minilabs
- Barcode readers
- Laser engraving of printing plate
- Laser bonding of additive marking materials for decoration and identification,
- Laser pointers
- Laser mice
- Laser accelerometers
- OLED display manufacturing
- Holography
- Bubblegrams
- Optical tweezers
- Writing subtitles onto motion picture films.
- Power beaming, which is a possible solution to transfer energy to the climber of a Space elevator
- 3D laser scanners for accurate 3D measurement
- Laser line levels are used in surveying and construction. Lasers are also used for guidance for aircraft.
- Extensively in both consumer and industrial imaging equipment.
- In laser printers: gas and diode lasers play a key role in manufacturing high resolution printing plates and in image scanning equipment.
- Diode lasers are used as a lightswitch in industry, with a laser beam and a receiver which will switch on or off when the beam is interrupted, and because a laser can keep the light intensity over larger distances than a normal light, and is more precise than a normal light it can be used for product detection in automated production.
- Laser alignment
- Additive manufacturing
- Plastic welding
- Metrology - handheld and robotic laser systems for Aerospace, Automotive and Rail applications
- To store and retrieve data in optical discs, such as CDs and DVDs
- Blu-ray

=== Entertainment and recreation ===
- Laser lighting displays accompany many music concerts
- Laser tag
- Laser harp: a musical instrument were the strings are replaced with laser beams
- As a light source for digital cinema projectors

== Images ==
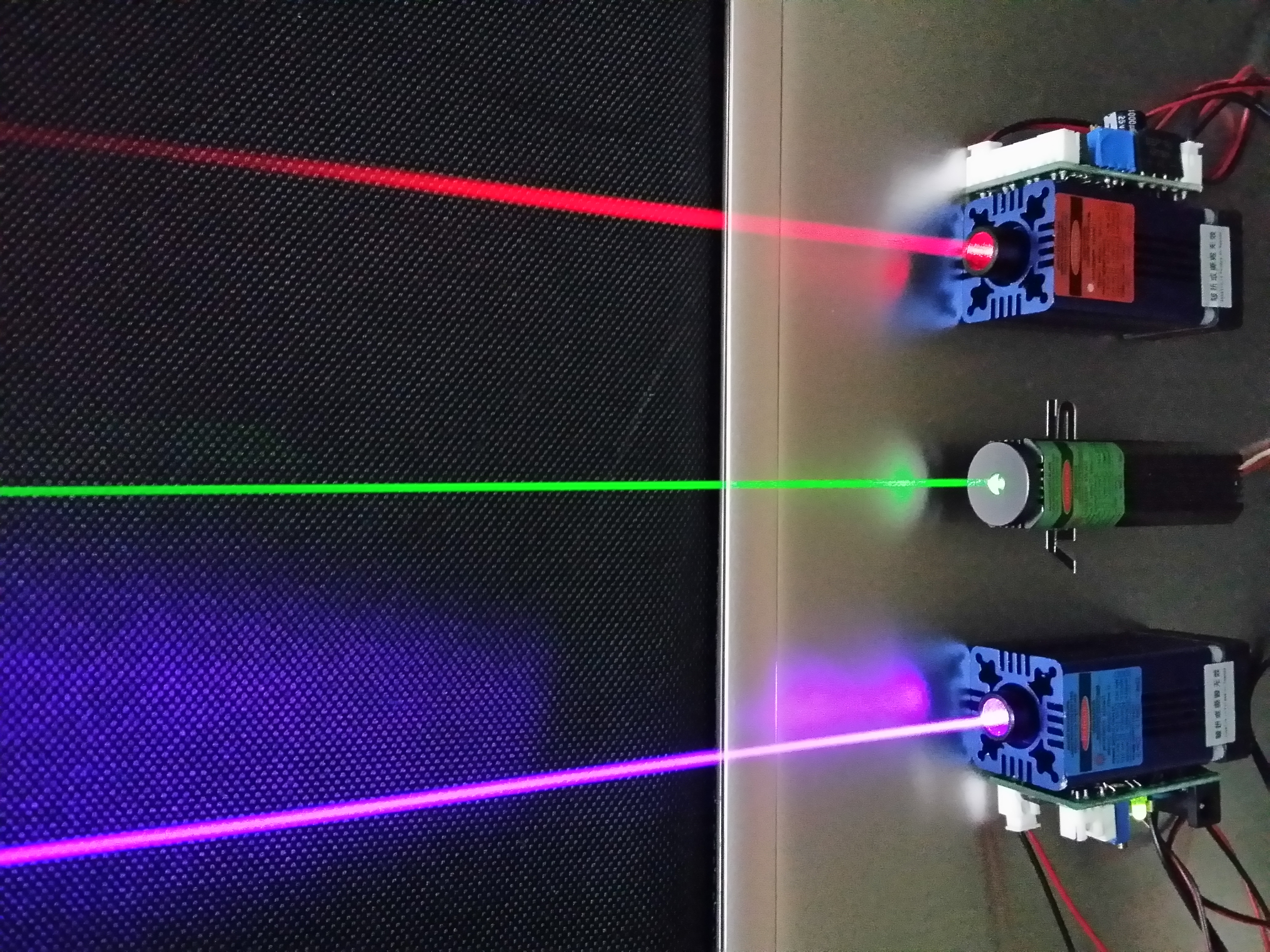
Laser models in different colours

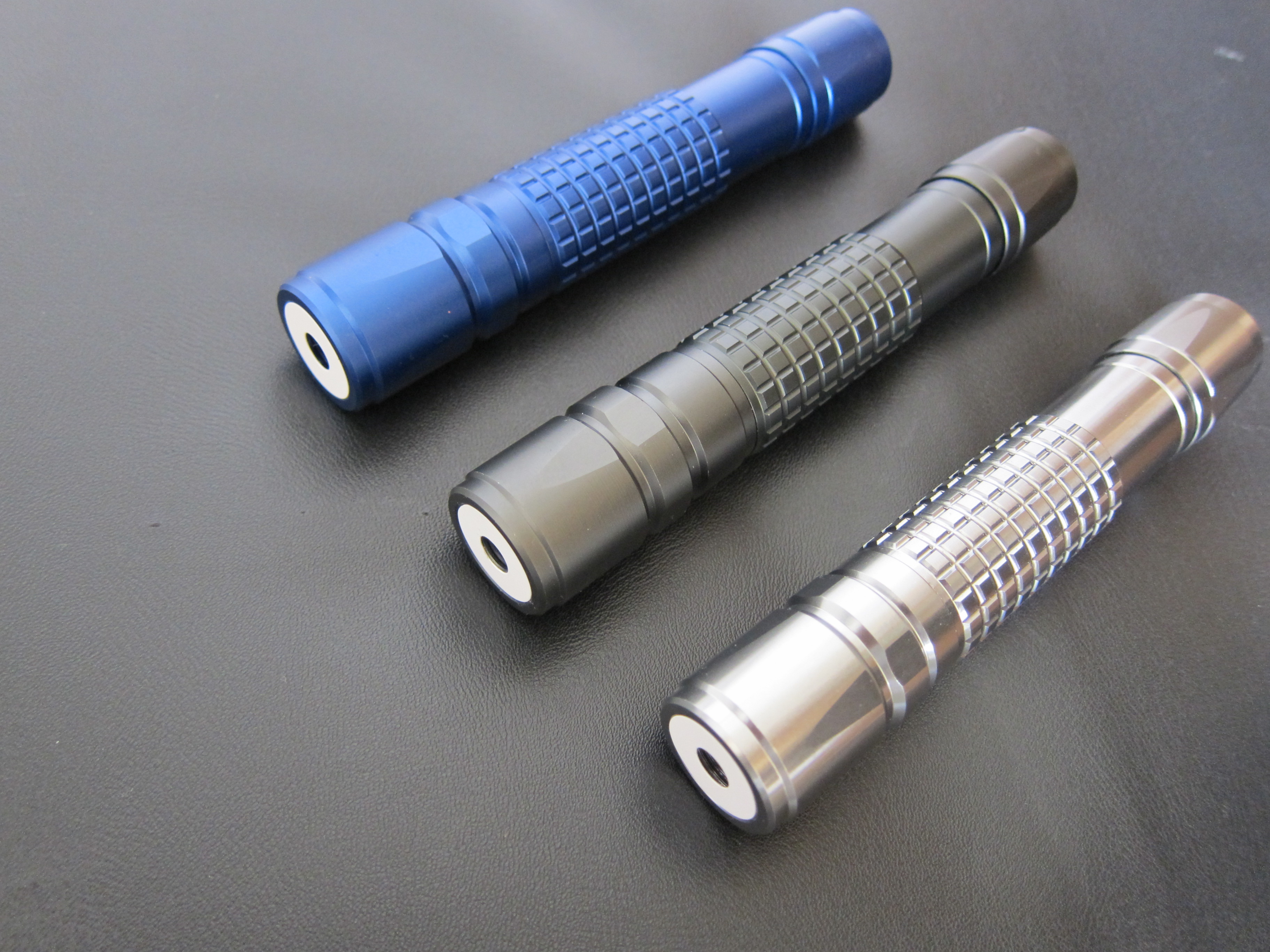
Q-line Lasers

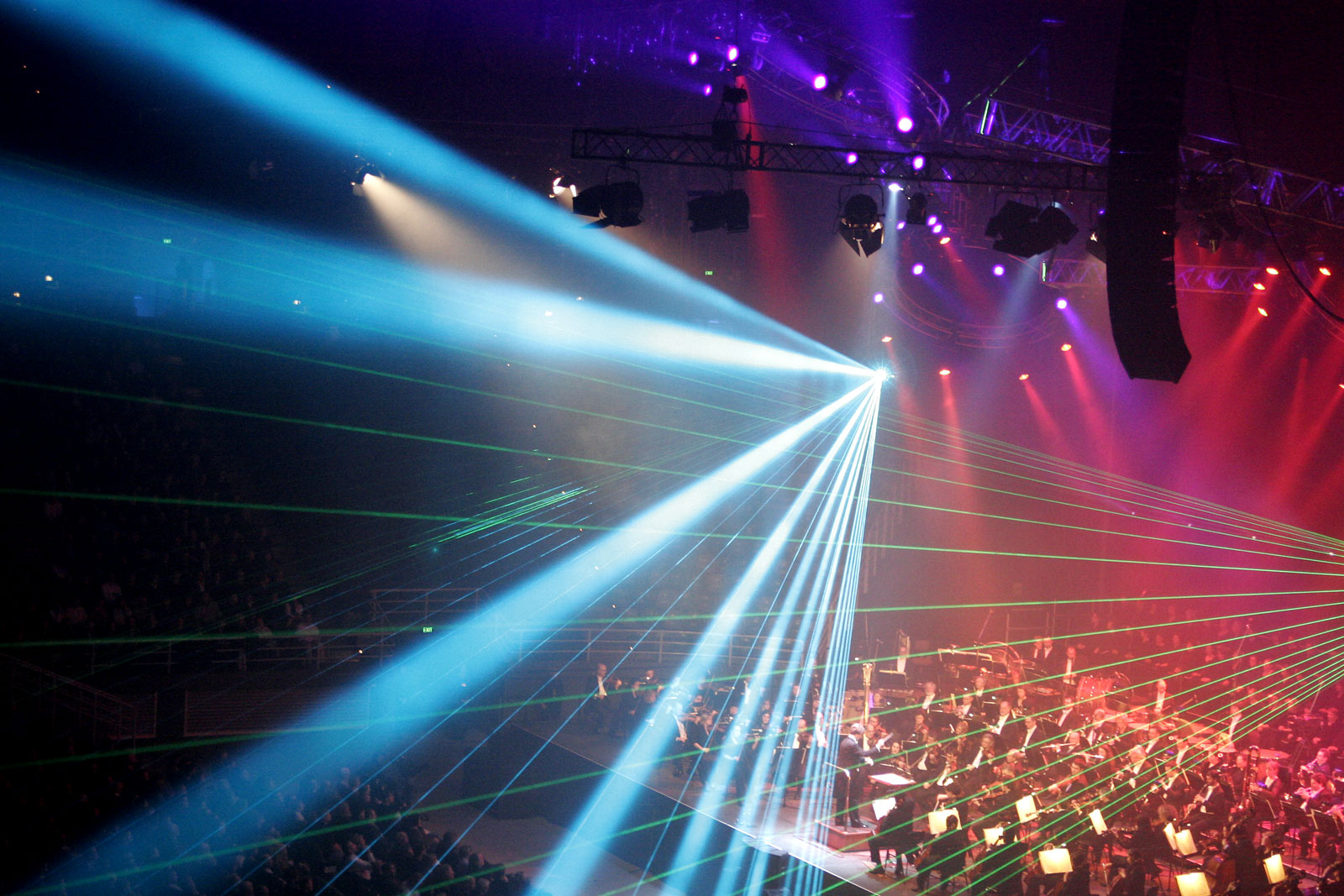
Lasers were used in the 2005 Classical Spectacular concert

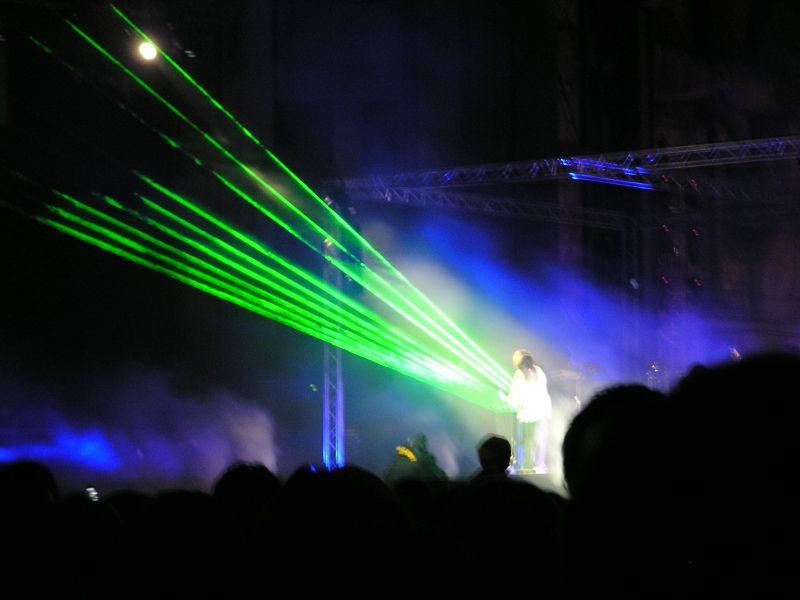
A laser harp

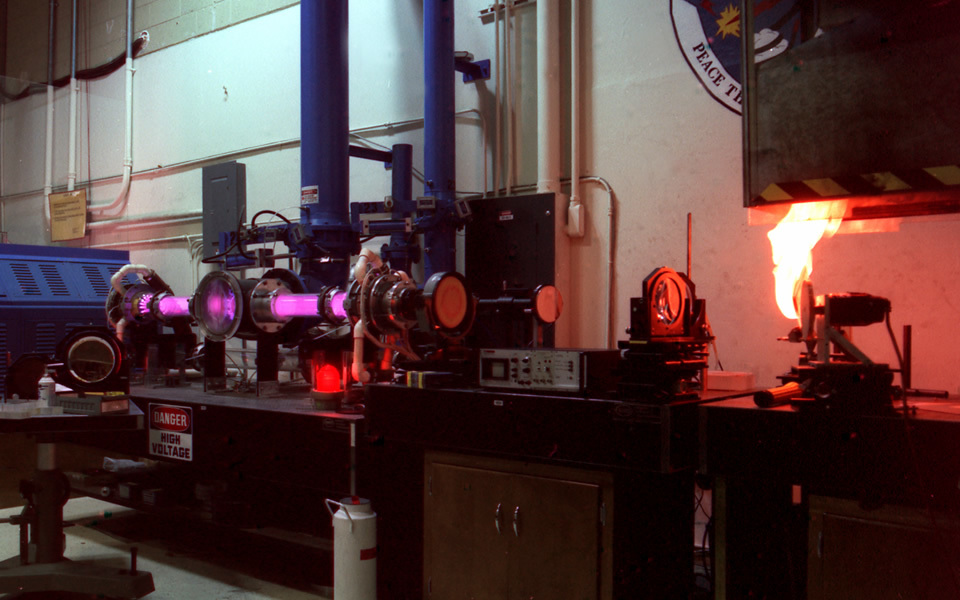
The surface of a test target is instantly vaporized and bursts into flame upon irradiation by a high power continuous wave carbon dioxide laser emitting tens of kilowatts of far infrared light. Note the operator is standing behind sheets of plexiglas, which is opaque in the far infrared.

== See also ==
- List of laser articles
- Non-lethal weapon
