= Bubblegram imaging =

2012 technological device

Bubblegram imaging is an imaging technique developed in 2012 by Alasdair Steven from NIAMS Laboratory of Structural Biology Research, in collaboration with Lindsay Black at the University of Maryland Medical School. The technique is used in research and medical fields in order to identify protein structures of viruses and bacteria. A three-dimensional computer reconstruction (computer animation, graphics, and virtual reality to capture such images) is also used to reconstruct the initial images of the specimens.

In X-ray crystallography, where beams of X-rays being aimed into different directions of the proteins/bacteria structure, radiation is utilized to see the structures of the bacteria. The structures are sensitive to the radiation, and may be destroyed in the process of analysis. 3D computer reconstruction is used to capture the images of the layouts before they are damaged. Bubblegram imaging is used to identify several molecular cells, nucleic acids, and more by incorporating these two main components into one technique.

== History ==
Bubblegram imaging is a technique created to view the surfaces of specimens. Cryogenic electron microscopy (cryo-EM) has been used to achieve similar goals, as it is used to identify the structures of bacteria, viruses, and proteins. In some applications, cryo-EM cannot fully capture internal structures, as the structures may be damaged by radiation before any images are captured.

=== Cryogenic electron microscopy ===
Cryogenic electron microscopy is the initial technique that allowed scientists to image particles and structures on the surface of viruses. An electron microscope is utilized so electrons illuminate the viruses or bacteria observed. The light is manipulated at different angles, and this creates multiple images of the bacterial structure. Radiation is emitted by the electrons since they are being shot at high speeds. However, this radiation damages the original structures. So, the researchers had to find alternatives so they could capture moments before the structures were disintegrated.

=== How Bubblegram Imaging was created ===
Bubblegram imaging was developed in January 2012 as an alternative to cryo-EM, as it displayed exact representations of the structures and cellular complexes. The researchers found that high radiation exposure made the internal structures of the specimens look like bubbles clumped up together. They named this technique after a bubblegram. A bubblegram is a block of glass or transparent plastic that has engravings inside, that when you shift the block around you can see all the angles and details of whatever image has been printed. The computer images help the researchers recognize and see 3 dimensional angles of the assembly of the objects, which is another characteristic similar to a bubblegram.

== Three-dimensional computer reconstruction ==
Three-dimensional computer reconstruction is when a specimen, item, or object is observed under a designated computer and then recreated with virtual technology on the computer. In this process, the actual object observed is reconstructed with the use of 2D images or previous photographs of the item. In X-ray crystallography, the structures are exposed to radiation, so the computer can manipulate the image of the protein structures to see its surface seconds before it was exposed to the X-rays. The computer can produce images that highlight different parts of the surface in different colors or shades, so that it is easier for the researchers to identify the internal assembly. It provides accurate angles of the 2D image by using advanced points of view, lighting, and technological components.

== X-ray crystallography ==
X-ray crystallography is a tool that can identify the structure of a crystal at the molecular and atomic levels; by using electromagnetic radiation, in specific X-ray beams. Within the process of X-ray crystallography, clouds of electrons form, and these clouds have the equivalent wavelength of X-ray radiation. This is why the light scattered by the electrons is called "diffraction". Electron diffraction, are patterns formed from electron beams that help locate the atoms in the crystal structure. Electron beams are streams of electricity-charged electrons that are being deflected, charged at, and collide with each other to create the patterns needed. electrons that play a huge role in resulting the (further explain diffraction) After determining the atoms they can then analyze the density of the electrons to map the protein structure with the Fourier transformation calculation. The Fourier transformation is the calculation that must be used as it calculates the frequencies present in the structure with the Fourier transformation calculation. The Fourier transformation is the calculation that must be used, as it calculates the frequencies present in the function or experiment. These calculations are usually done with computers since their software can be programmed to find the solution.
