= Laser crystal =

Laser crystal may refer to:

- a type of active laser medium, the source of optical gain within a laser
- Bubblegram, a solid block of glass or transparent plastic exposed to laser beams to generate a 3D designs inside
