= Re-tooling =

Re-tooling or retooling may refer to:

- Changing tools
- Tool management change
- Soft retooling
- Reboot (fiction)

== See also ==
- Tooling (disambiguation)
