= Detlef Günther (chemist) =

German-Swiss analytical chemist and professor

- Born: 21 November 1963 (age 62)
- Citizenship: German, Swiss
- Education: Martin Luther University Halle-Wittenberg
- Known for: Laser ablation ICP-MS
- Awards: Paracelsus Award (2026); Ioannes Marcus Marci Medal (2022); Fellow of the Royal Society of Chemistry
- Scientific career
- Fields: Analytical chemistry Mass spectrometry
- Workplaces: ETH Zurich
- Doctoral advisor: L. Moenke-Blankenburg

Detlef Günther (born 21 November 1963) is a German-Swiss analytical chemist and professor at ETH Zurich. He has worked in analytical chemistry, particularly mass spectrometry, laser ablation, and trace-element analysis.

Günther served as Vice President Research and Corporate Relations at ETH Zurich from 2015 to 2020 and as Vice President Research from 2021 to 2022.

He is a member of the German National Academy of Sciences Leopoldina and a Fellow of the Royal Society of Chemistry.

== Early life and education ==
Günther was born on 21 November 1963. He attended primary school in Lübs from 1970 to 1978. He attended the Gymnasium in Zerbst, completing his secondary education in 1982. He studied chemistry at Martin Luther University Halle-Wittenberg, graduating as a Diplomchemiker in 1987.

He received the degree of Dr. rer. nat. from the same university in 1990.

== Career ==
From 1992 to 1994, Günther worked in the Department of Stress Research at the Institute of Plant Biochemistry in Halle in the group of L. Nover. In 1994, he moved to the Department of Earth Sciences at Memorial University of Newfoundland, where he worked as a postdoctoral researcher with H. P. Longerich. From 1995 to 1998, Günther worked in the Department of Isotope Geology and Mineral Resources at ETH Zurich with C. A. Heinrich. During this period, he worked on laser-ablation ICP-MS and its application to geological materials, including fluid inclusions.

Günther joined ETH Zurich as an assistant professor of analytical chemistry and trace-element analysis in 1998. He became an associate professor and later a full professor. He has headed the Research Group for Elemental and Trace Analysis at ETH Zurich. From 1999 to 2003, he chaired the Center of Excellence in Analytical Chemistry at ETH Zurich. He was Head of the Laboratory of Inorganic Chemistry from 2006 to 2008 and chaired the Department of Chemistry and Applied Biosciences from 2010 to 2012. From 2015 to 2020, Günther served as Vice President Research and Corporate Relations at ETH Zurich. He served as Vice President Research from 2021 to 2022.

== Research ==
Günther has contributed to the development of laser-ablation ICP-MS, including instrumentation for quantitative analysis of geological materials. In 1997, he and colleagues reported the use of a 193 nm argon-fluoride excimer laser for laser-ablation ICP-MS microanalysis.

His group has investigated aerosol formation and transport during laser ablation, including the effects of carrier gases and particle size on elemental fractionation in LA-ICP-MS. A 2013 study reported chemical imaging at high spatial resolution using the technique.

In 2012, Günther and colleagues reported a portable laser-ablation sampling device designed for elemental analysis of objects outside the laboratory. The system collected laser-generated aerosols for laboratory analysis and was developed for applications involving objects that could not readily be transported to a laboratory.

Günther's group has also worked on inductively coupled plasma time-of-flight mass spectrometry (ICP-TOFMS), including applications involving rapidly changing samples and single particles. Research from the group examined the use of ICP-TOFMS for the detection of nanoparticles in microdroplets.

In 2013, the group reported a prototype ICP-TOF mass spectrometer designed for temporally resolved, multi-element detection of short signals generated by individual particles and droplets.

In 2018, Günther and colleagues reported a nitrogen microwave-induced plasma system as an alternative to argon-based inductively coupled plasma for mass spectrometry.

== Awards and honours ==
Year	Award or honour
2026	Paracelsus Award, Swiss Chemical Society
2022	Ioannes Marcus Marci Medal, Ioannes Marcus Marci Spectroscopic Society
2015	Simon-Widmer Award, Swiss Chemical Society
2015	Fellow of the Society for Applied Spectroscopy
2015	Emich Plakette, Austrian Society for Mass Spectrometry
2014	Member of the German National Academy of Sciences Leopoldina
2013	Japan Society for the Promotion of Science Fellowship
2012	Nicolaus Konkoly-Thege Medal, Societas Spectroscopica Slovaca
2010	Fellow of the Royal Society of Chemistry
2008	Memorial Medal of the Faculty of Natural Sciences, Comenius University Bratislava
2007	Lester W. Strock Award, FACSS
2007	Fresenius Award, Wissenschaftsforum Chemie
2003	European Award for Plasma Spectrochemistry
2002	Ruzicka Prize, ETH Zurich
2002	Research Award, Thailand Gem and Jewelry Traders Association

== Selected publications ==
- Günther, Detlef; Frischknecht, Rolf; Heinrich, Christoph A.; Kahler, Hans-Jürgen (1997). "Capabilities of an Argon Fluoride 193 nm Excimer Laser for Laser Ablation Inductively Coupled Plasma Mass Spectrometry Microanalysis of Geological Materials". Journal of Analytical Atomic Spectrometry. 12: 939–944. doi:10.1039/A701423F.
- Longerich, H. P.; Jackson, S. E.; Günther, D. (1996). "Laser ablation inductively coupled plasma mass spectrometric transient signal data acquisition and analyte concentration calculation". Journal of Analytical Atomic Spectrometry. 11: 899–904.
- Günther, Detlef; Koch, Joachim (2008). "Formation of aerosols generated by laser ablation and their impact on elemental fractionation in LA-ICP-MS". Elements. 4: 243–248.
- Flamigni, Luca; Koch, Joachim; Günther, Detlef (2012). "Experimental and theoretical investigations about the vaporization of laser-produced aerosols and individual particles inside inductively-coupled plasmas: Implications for the extraction efficiency of ions prior to mass spectrometry". Spectrochimica Acta Part B: Atomic Spectroscopy. 76: 70–76.
- Glaus, Reto; Koch, Joachim; Günther, Detlef (2012). "Portable Laser Ablation Sampling Device for Elemental Fingerprinting of Objects Outside the Laboratory with Laser Ablation Inductively Coupled Plasma Mass Spectrometry". Analytical Chemistry. 84 (12): 5358–5364. doi:10.1021/ac3008626.
