= ArtPix =

ArtPix 3D
- Trade name: ArtPix 3D
- Type: Private (limited liability company)
- Industry: Personalized gifts
- Founded: 2017
- Founder: Roman Sherhelashvili
- Headquarters: Elk Grove Village, Illinois, United States
- Key people: Roman Sherhelashvili (founder, owner and CEO)
- Products: Laser-engraved crystal photos, acrylic, glass and bamboo photo blocks, memorial keepsakes and other personalized gifts
- Website: artpix3d.com

ArtPix 3D (legal name ArtPix, LLC) is an American company that produces and sells personalized gifts, best known for photographs engraved inside blocks of crystal using subsurface laser engraving. The company is based in Elk Grove Village, Illinois, and sells mainly online, through its own website and on Amazon.

== History ==
ArtPix 3D was founded in 2017 in Illinois by Roman Sherhelashvili, who owns the company and is its chief executive officer.

In December 2019, ArtPix, LLC applied to register the ARTPIX 3D trademark, which was registered by the United States Patent and Trademark Office on October 6, 2020, for engraved 3D crystal products and online retail services for personalized merchandise and custom gifts. The company subsequently registered additional marks, including ARTPIX and ARTPIX 3D ART AND TECHNOLOGIES, in 2022.

== Products ==
ArtPix 3D's main product is a personalized 3D photo crystal. Customers submit a photograph, which the company processes into a three-dimensional model and engraves inside a K9 crystal block using subsurface laser engraving. Customers receive a digital proof to approve before production, and the crystals come in a range of shapes and sizes, and LED light bases are sold separately.

The company also sells personalized crystal keychains, necklaces, wine stoppers and ornaments, as well as acrylic and wooden photo products, puzzles, mugs and pillows. Its product range includes memorial items, such as cross-, tombstone- and sunset-shaped crystals, and pet-related products such as paw-shaped crystals. Its products are designed and manufactured at its own facility in the Chicago area.

In 2024, ArtPix 3D expanded its product range to include UV-printed acrylic photo blocks, glass photo tiles and bamboo photo blocks. It also announced plans for personalized mugs, water bottles, cutting boards, pillows, doormats and puzzles.
