= Laser bonding =

Method to mark surfaces

Laser bonding is a marking technique that uses lasers to bond an additive marking substance to a substrate.

First invented in the mid 1990s by Essilor International, this patented method produces permanent marks on metal, glass, ceramic and plastic parts for a diverse range of industrial and artistic applications, ranging from aerospace and medical to the awards and engraving industries. It differs from the more widely known techniques of laser engraving and laser ablation in that it is an additive process, adding material to the substrate surface instead of removing it.

Laser bonding has been achieved by Nd:YAG, CO_{2} laser, Fiber laser and Diode-pumped solid-state laser and can be accomplished using other forms of radiant energy.

== The laser bonding process ==
Mark quality depends on a variety of factors, including the substrate used, marking speed, laser spot size, beam overlap, materials thickness, and laser parameters. Laser bonding materials may be applied by various methods, including a brush on technique, spraying, pad printing, screen printing, roll coating, tape, and others.

The marking process generally comprises three steps:

1. Application of the marking material.

2. Irradiating the marking material with a laser in the form of the desired mark.

3. Removal of excess, unbonded material.

The resulting marking is permanently bonded to the substrate, and in most cases it is as durable as the substrate itself.

== The durability of laser bonded markings ==
Markings placed on stainless steel are extremely durable and have survived such testing as abrasion resistance, chemical resistance, outdoor exposure, extreme heat, extreme cold, acids, bases and various organic solvents.

Marks on glass have been tested for resistance to acids, bases and scratching.

NASA's International Space Station, or ISS, was home to aluminum squares laser marked with CerMark® marking material for almost four years. These squares were part of the Material International Space Station Experiment, or MISSE.

In this experiment test markings were applied to coupons made of materials commonly used in the construction of the external components used on space transportation vehicles, satellites and space stations. Markings applied using a wide range of different methods and techniques, including laser bonding. The material test coupons were then affixed to spaces provided on test panels, which were then installed onto trays which were attached to the ISS during a space walk conducted during the STS-105 Mission flown on August 10, 2001. The trays were positioned on the ISS so that they could expect to receive the maximum amount of impact damage and exposure to a high degree of atomic oxygen and UV radiation.

The experiment was recovered on July 30, 2005 during STS-114 and returned to earth on August 9, 2005. The markings, DataMatrix two dimensional bar codes, were evaluated and found to be readable and visually looked as good as the day they were placed in orbit.

The laser bonding process is outlined and specified in both military and NASA marking specifications and standards. Laser bonding is also a preferred technique for use in the United States Department of Defense "Item Unique Identification" system (IUID).

== See also ==
- Laser engraving
- Laser ablation
- Laser applications
