= Tooling =

Tooling may refer to:

- Machine tools and the tooling, such as cutting tools, fixtures, and accessories, that is used on them
  - Cutting tool (machining), any of hundreds of kinds of cutters
  - Fixture (tool), a fixed workholding or support device
  - Jig (tool), a movable workholding or support device
  - Tool management, keeping track of, and maximizing efficient use of, all the tooling
- Tooling (bookbinding), the decoration of bookbindings
- Tooling University, a training program of the Society of Mechanical Engineers that teaches machinists about machine tools and tooling
- Agile tooling, the process of using modular means to design tooling that is produced by additive manufacturing or 3D printing methods to enable quick prototyping and responses to tooling and fixture needs
- Programming tools, a set of apps that supports software development

== See also ==
- Re-tooling (disambiguation)
- Tool (disambiguation)
