= Soft retooling =

Soft retooling is a process that changes the ablation shape during laser ablation without changing any hardware. Contrarily to conventional milling, it is possible with laser sculpting to change ablation geometry just by changing parameters of laser ablation that have the desired effects on laser ablation. Conventional milling machines contain trays on which different tool bits are stored and must consider in their machining routine tool change. This operation is not necessary when using laser sculpting.
