= Laser engraving =

Engraving objects using lasers

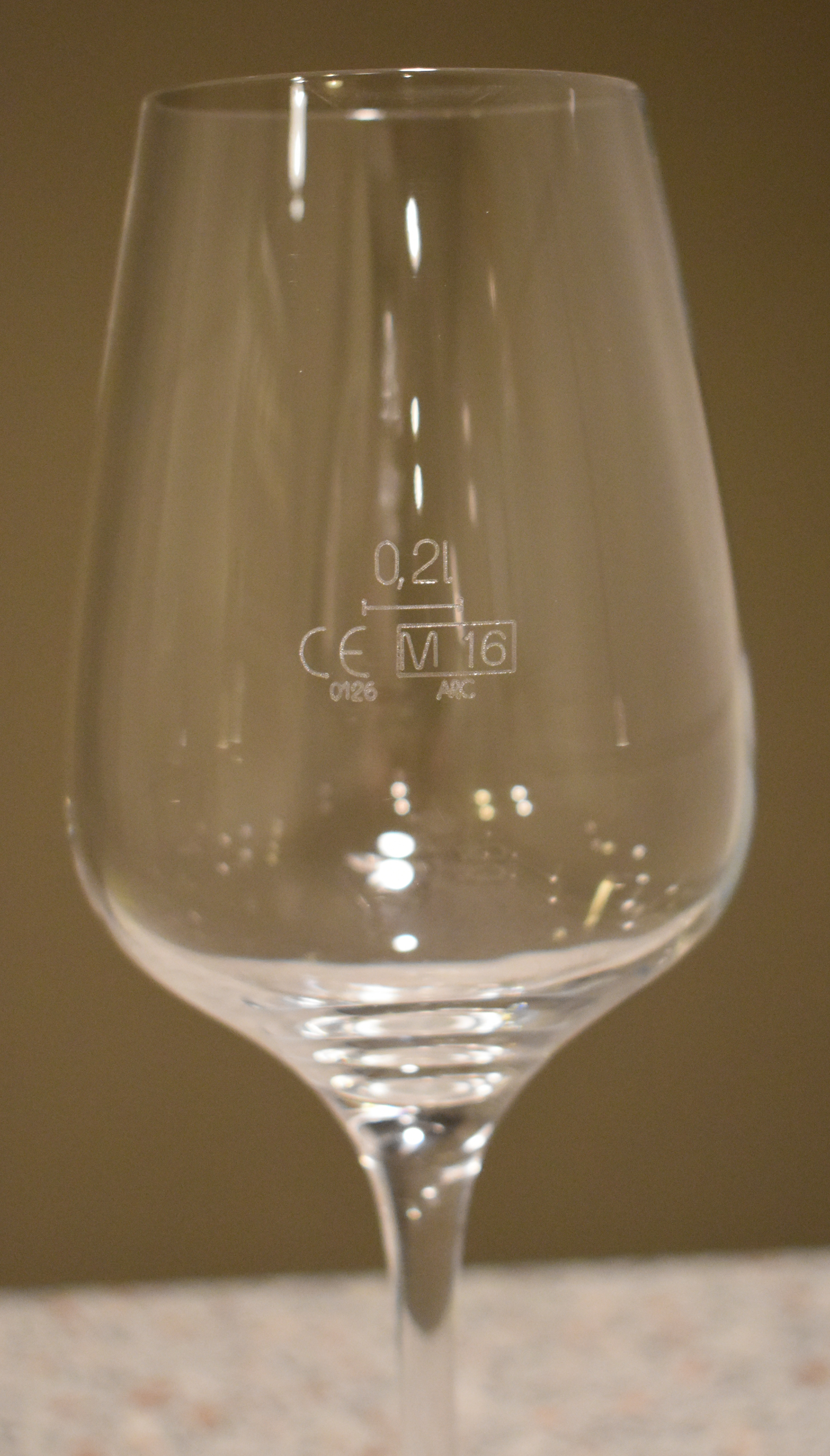
A wine glass with a laser-engraved fill line.

Laser engraving is the practice of using lasers to engrave an object. The engraving process renders a design by physically cutting into the object to remove material. The technique does not involve the use of inks or tool bits that contact the engraving surface and wear out, giving it an advantage over alternative marking technologies, where inks or bit heads have to be replaced regularly.

That process is distinct from laser marking, which involves using a laser to mark an object via any of a variety of methods, including color change due to chemical alteration, charring, foaming, melting, ablation, and more. Laser marking is a common method for applying variable dates, lot and batch codes, 2D codes, alphanumeric text, and graphics to products and packaging during production. However, the term laser marking is also used as a generic term covering a broad spectrum of surfacing techniques including printing, hot-branding, and laser bonding. The machines for laser engraving and laser marking are sometimes the same, so the two terms are sometimes confused by those without relevant expertise.

The impact of laser marking has been more pronounced for specially designed "laserable" materials and also for some paints. These include laser-sensitive polymers and novel metal alloys.

== Laser engraving mechanisms ==
Laser engraving is the process of selectively removing microscopic layers of material, thus creating visible marks on the treated surface. Depending on the materials, the laser-material interactions can be different. On harder surfaces, the mechanism of action is primarily the ablation where the focused beam of laser dislodges microscopic particles from the substrate. Engraving can achieve depth of 100μm and beyond, whereas laser marking is typically shallower.

The choice of lasers is important for the quality of the mark. To create a clean mark, short bursts of high quality laser pulses are preferable, since they are able to transfer large amounts of energy without causing significant heating and melting of the sample. For example, engraving using femtosecond lasers enhances precision, as these lasers emit extremely short pulses that create high-resolution marks without significant heating, avoiding material distortion or alteration. This technology is especially valuable for materials where thermal effects must be minimized, like metals, plastics, and sensitive electronics.

== Laser engraving machines ==
Laser marking on stainless steel

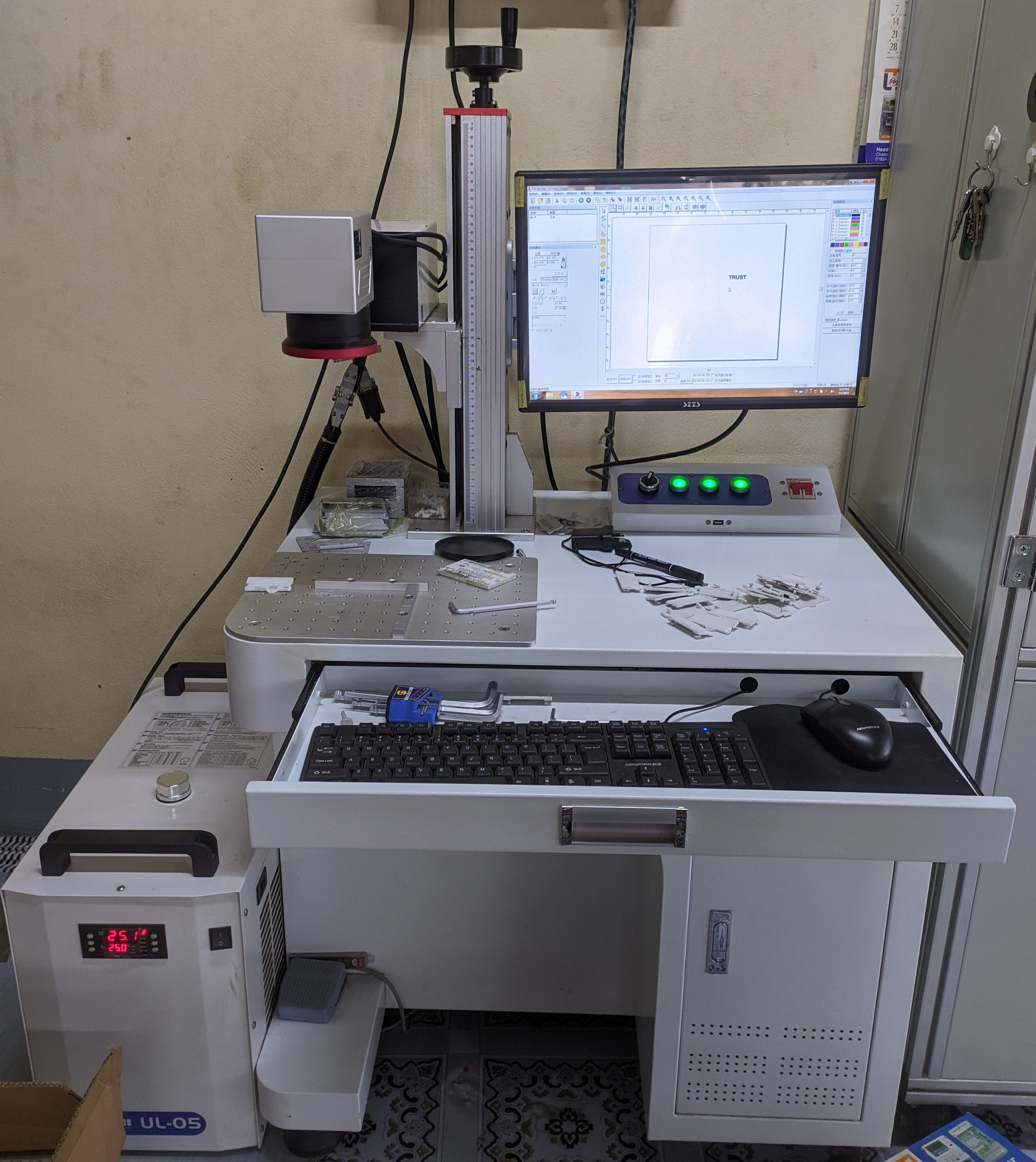
Complete setup of a laser engraving machine

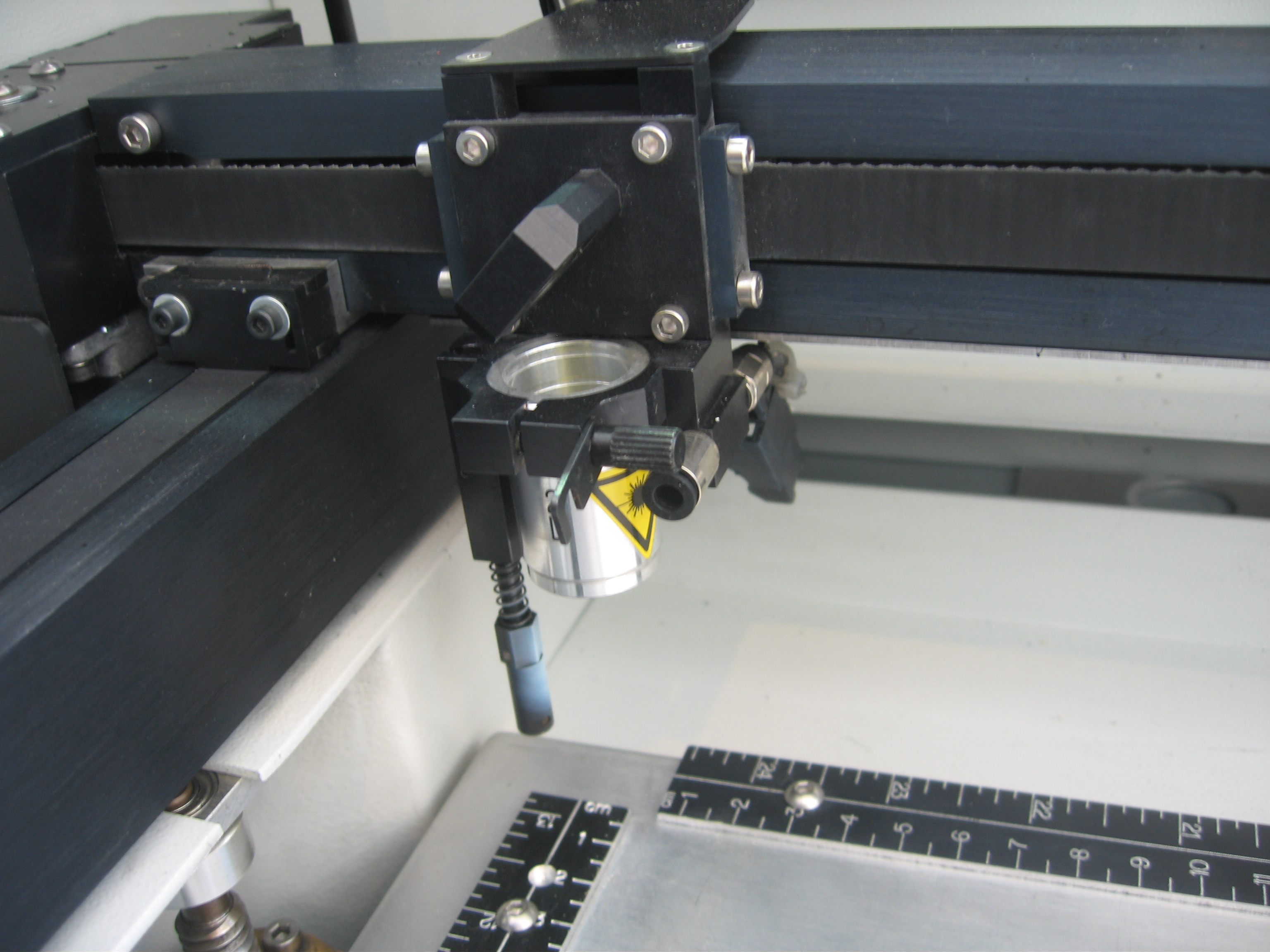
A laser engraver

A laser engraving machine consists of three main parts: a laser, a controller, and a surface. The laser is a drawing tool: the beam emitted from it allows the controller to trace patterns onto the surface. The controller determines the direction, intensity, speed of movement, and spread of the laser beam aimed at the surface. The surface is chosen to match the type of material the laser can act on.

The point where the laser beam touches the surface should be on the focal plane of the laser's optical system and is usually synonymous with its focal point. This point is typically small, perhaps less than a fraction of a millimetre (depending on the optical wavelength). Only the area inside this focal point is significantly affected when the laser beam passes over the surface. The energy delivered by the laser changes the surface of the material at the focal point. It may heat up the surface and subsequently vaporise the material, or perhaps the material may fracture (known as "glassing" or "glassing up") and flake off the surface. Cutting through the paint of a metal part is generally how material is laser engraved.

If the surface material is vaporised during laser engraving, ventilation through the use of blowers or a vacuum pump are almost always required to remove the noxious fumes and smoke arising from this process, and for removal of debris on the surface to allow the laser to continue engraving.

A laser can remove material very efficiently because the laser beam can be designed to deliver energy to the surface in a manner which converts a high percentage of the light energy into heat. The beam is highly focused and collimated—in most non-reflective materials like wood, plastics and enamel surfaces, the conversion of light energy to heat is more than {x%} efficient. However, because of this efficiency, the equipment used in laser engraving may heat up rather quickly. Elaborate cooling systems are required for the laser. Alternatively, the laser beam may be pulsed to decrease the amount of excessive heating.

Different patterns can be engraved by programming the controller to traverse a particular path for the laser beam over time. The trace of the laser beam is carefully regulated to achieve a consistent removal depth of material. For example, criss-crossed paths are avoided to ensure that each etched surface is exposed to the laser only once, so the same amount of material is removed. The speed at which the beam moves across the material is also considered in creating engraving patterns. Changing the intensity and spread of the beam allows more flexibility in the design. For example, by changing the proportion of time (known as "duty-cycle") the laser is turned on during each pulse, the power delivered to the engraving surface can be controlled appropriately for the material.

Since the position of the laser is known exactly by the controller, it is not necessary to add barriers to the surface to prevent the laser from deviating from the prescribed engraving pattern. As a result, no resistive mask is needed in laser engraving. This is primarily why this technique is different from older engraving methods.

A good example of where laser engraving technology has been adopted into the industry norm is the production line. In this particular setup, the laser beam is directed towards a rotating or vibrating mirror. The mirror moves in a manner which may trace out numbers and letters onto the surface being marked. This is particularly useful for printing dates, expiry codes, and lot numbering of products travelling along a production line. Laser marking allows materials made of plastic and glass to be marked "on the move". The location where the marking takes place is called a "marking laser station", an entity often found in packaging and bottling plants. Older, slower technologies such as hot stamping and pad printing have largely been phased out and replaced with laser engraving.

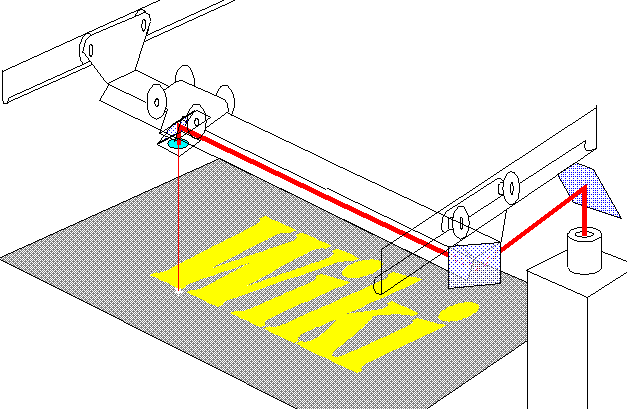
Mirrors on both X and Y carriages allow exact positioning.

For more precise and visually decorative engravings, a laser table (also known as an "X–Y" or "XY" table) is used. The laser is usually fixed permanently to the side of the table and emits light towards a pair of movable mirrors so that every point of the table surface can be swept by the laser. At the point of engraving, the laser beam is focused through a lens at the engraving surface, allowing very precise and intricate patterns to be traced out.

A typical setup of a laser table involves the fixed laser emitting light parallel to one axis of the table aimed at a mirror mounted on the end of an adjustable rail. The beam reflects off the mirror angled at 45 degrees so that the laser travels a path exactly along the length of the rail. This beam is then reflected by another mirror mounted to a movable trolley which directs the beam perpendicular to the original axis. In this scheme, two degrees of freedom (one vertical, and one horizontal) for etching can be represented.

In other laser engraving devices such as flat table or drum engraving, the laser beam is controlled to direct most of its energy a fixed penetration depth into the material to be engraved. In this manner, only a particular depth of material is removed when the engraving takes place. A simple machined stick or angle-iron can be used as a tool to help trained technologists adjust the engraver to achieve the required focusing. This setup is preferred for surfaces which do not vary in height appreciably.

For surfaces that vary in height, more elaborate focusing mechanisms have been developed. Some are known as dynamic auto focus systems. They adjust the lasing parameters in real time to adapt to the changes to the material as it is being etched. Typically, the height and depth of the surface are monitored with devices tracking changes to ultrasound, infrared, or visible light aimed at the engraving surface. These devices, known as pilot beams or pilot lasers (if a laser is used) help guide the adjustments made to the lens of the laser in determining the optimal spot to focus on the surface and remove material effectively.

"X–Y" laser engraving machines may operate in vector and raster mode.

Vector engraving follows the line and curve of the pattern to be engraved, much like a pen-based plotter draws by constructing line segments from a description of the outlines of a pattern. Much early engraving of signs and plaques (laser or otherwise) used pre-stored font outlines so that letters, numbers or even logos could be scaled to size and reproduced with exactly defined strokes. Unfortunately, "fill" areas were problematic, as cross-hatching patterns and dot-fills sometimes exhibited moiré effects or uber-patterns caused by the imprecise calculation of dot spacings. Moreover, rotations of a font or dynamic scaling often were beyond the capabilities of the font-rendering device. The introduction of the PostScript page-description language now allows much greater flexibility—now virtually anything that can be described in vectors by PostScript-enabled software like CorelDRAW or Adobe Illustrator can be outlined, filled with suitable patterns, and laser-engraved.

Raster engraving traces the laser across the surface in a back-and-forth slowly advancing linear pattern that will remind one of the printhead on an inkjet or similar printer. The pattern is usually optimized by the controller/computer so that areas to either side of the pattern which are not to be engraved are ignored and the trace across the material is thus shortened for better efficiency. The amount of advance of each line is normally less than the actual dot-size of the laser; the engraved lines overlap just slightly to create a continuity of engravure. As is true of all rasterized devices, curves and diagonals can sometimes suffer if the length or position of the raster lines varies even slightly in relation to the adjacent raster scan; therefore exact positioning and repeatability are critically important to the design of the machine. The advantage of rasterizing is the near effortless "fill" it produces. Most images to be engraved are bold letters or have large continuously engraved areas, and these are well-rasterized. Photos are rasterized (as in printing), with dots larger than that of the laser's spot, and these also are best engraved as a raster image. Almost any page-layout software can be used to feed a raster driver for an X–Y or drum laser engraver. While traditional sign and plaque engraving tended to favour the solid strokes of vectors out of necessity, modern shops tend to run their laser engravers mostly in raster mode, reserving vector for a traditional outline "look" or for speedily marking outlines or "hatches" where a plate is to be cut.

== Materials that can be engraved ==
=== Natural materials ===
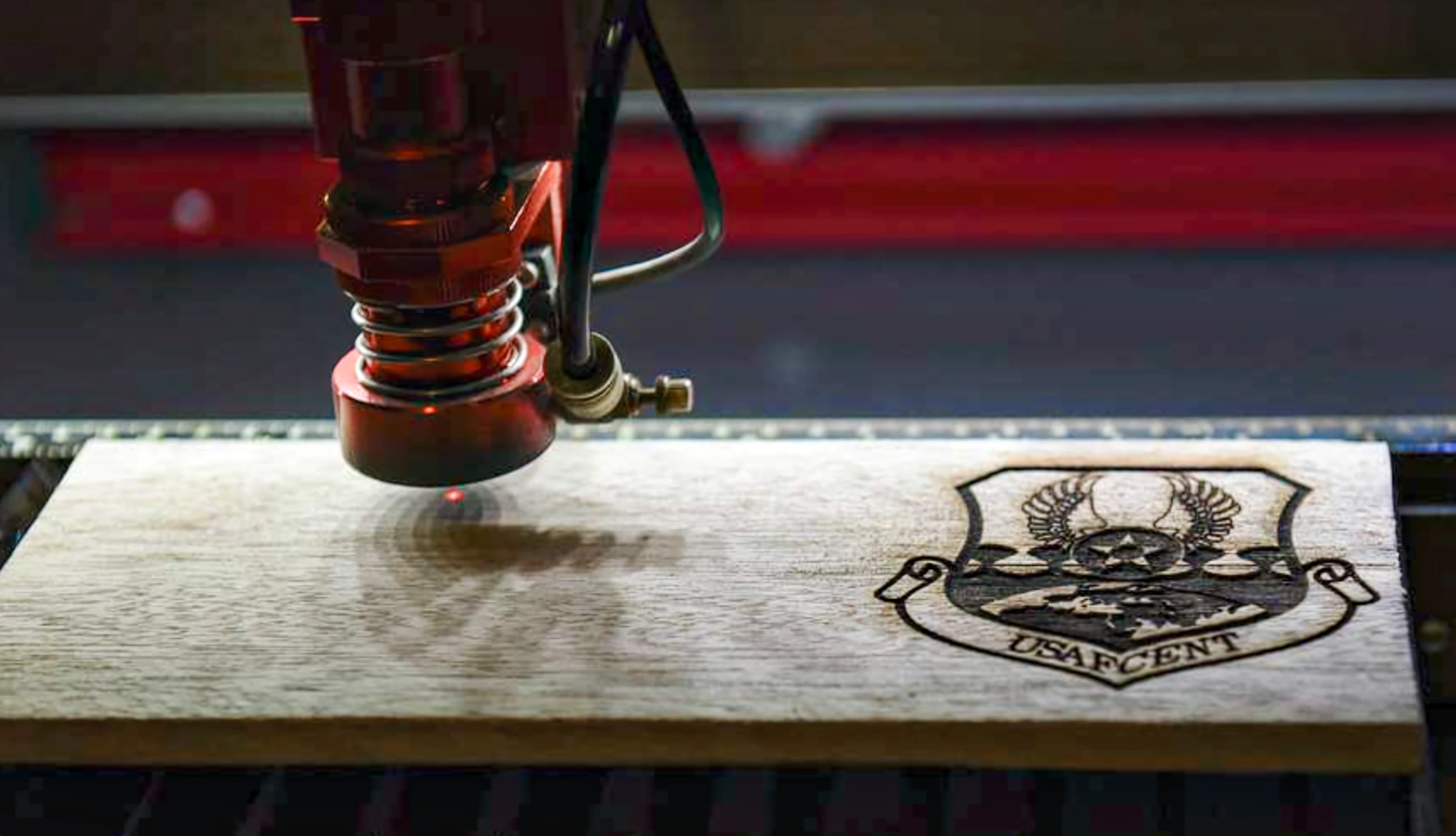
Laser engraved wood

The marking of organic materials like wood is based on material carbonisation which produces darkening of the surface and marks with high contrast. Directly "burning" images on wood were some of the first uses of engraving lasers. The laser power required here is often less than 10 watts depending on the laser being used as most are different. Hardwoods like walnut, mahogany and maple produce good results. Softwoods can be judiciously engraved but tend to vaporise at less-consistent depths. Marking softwood requires the lowest power levels and enables the fastest cut speeds, while active cooling (e.g. a fan with sufficient airflow) inhibits ignition. Hard papers and fiberboard work well; linty papers and newsprint are like softwoods. Fur is not engraveable; finished leathers though can be laser-engraved with a look very similar to hot-branding. Certain latex rubber compounds can be laser engraved; for example these can be used to fabricate inking-stamps.

Paper masking tape is sometimes used as a pre-engraving overcoat on finished and resiny woods so that cleanup is a matter of picking the tape off and out of the unengraved areas, which is easier than removing the sticky and smoky surround "halos" (and requires no varnish-removing chemicals).

=== Plastics ===
Each plastic has specific material properties, especially the light absorption spectrum. The laser irradiation can generate direct chemical modifications, melting or evaporation of the material. Plastics are rarely seen in their pure state because several additives are used such as colorants, ultraviolet retardants, release agents, etc. These additives impact the result of laser marking.

Standard cast acrylic plastic, acrylic plastic sheet, and other cast resins generally laser very well. A commonly engraved award is a cast acrylic shape designed to be lasered from the back side. Styrene (as in compact disc cases) and many of the thermoforming plastics will tend to melt around the edge of the engraving spot. The result is usually "soft" and has no "etch" contrast. The surface may actually deform or "ripple" at the lip areas. In some applications this is acceptable; for example date markings on 2-litre soda bottles do not need to be sharp.

For signage and face plates, etc., special laser-marked plastics were developed. These incorporate silicate or other materials which conduct excess heat away from the material before it can deform. Outer laminates of this material vaporise easily to expose different coloured material below.

Other plastics may be successfully engraved, but orderly experimentation on a sample piece is recommended. Bakelite is said to be easily laser-engraved; some hard engineering plastics work well. Expanded plastics, foams and vinyls, however, are generally candidates for routing rather than laser engraving. Plastics with a chlorine content (such as vinyl, PVC) produce corrosive chlorine gas when lasered, which combines with Hydrogen in the air to produce vaporised hydrochloric acid which can damage a laser engraving system. Urethane and silicone plastics usually do not work well, unless it is a formulation filled with cellulose, stone or some other stable insulator material.

Kevlar can be laser-engraved and laser-cut. However, Kevlar does give off extremely hazardous fumes (cyanide gas) when it is vaporised.

=== Metals ===
Metals are heat resistant and thermally conductive, making them more difficult to engrave than other materials. Due to their thermal conductivity, pulsed, rather than continuous wave lasers, are preferred in laser engraving applications. High peak power, low pulse duration lasers are able to ablate material off a metal engraving surface without delivering enough energy to melt the surface.

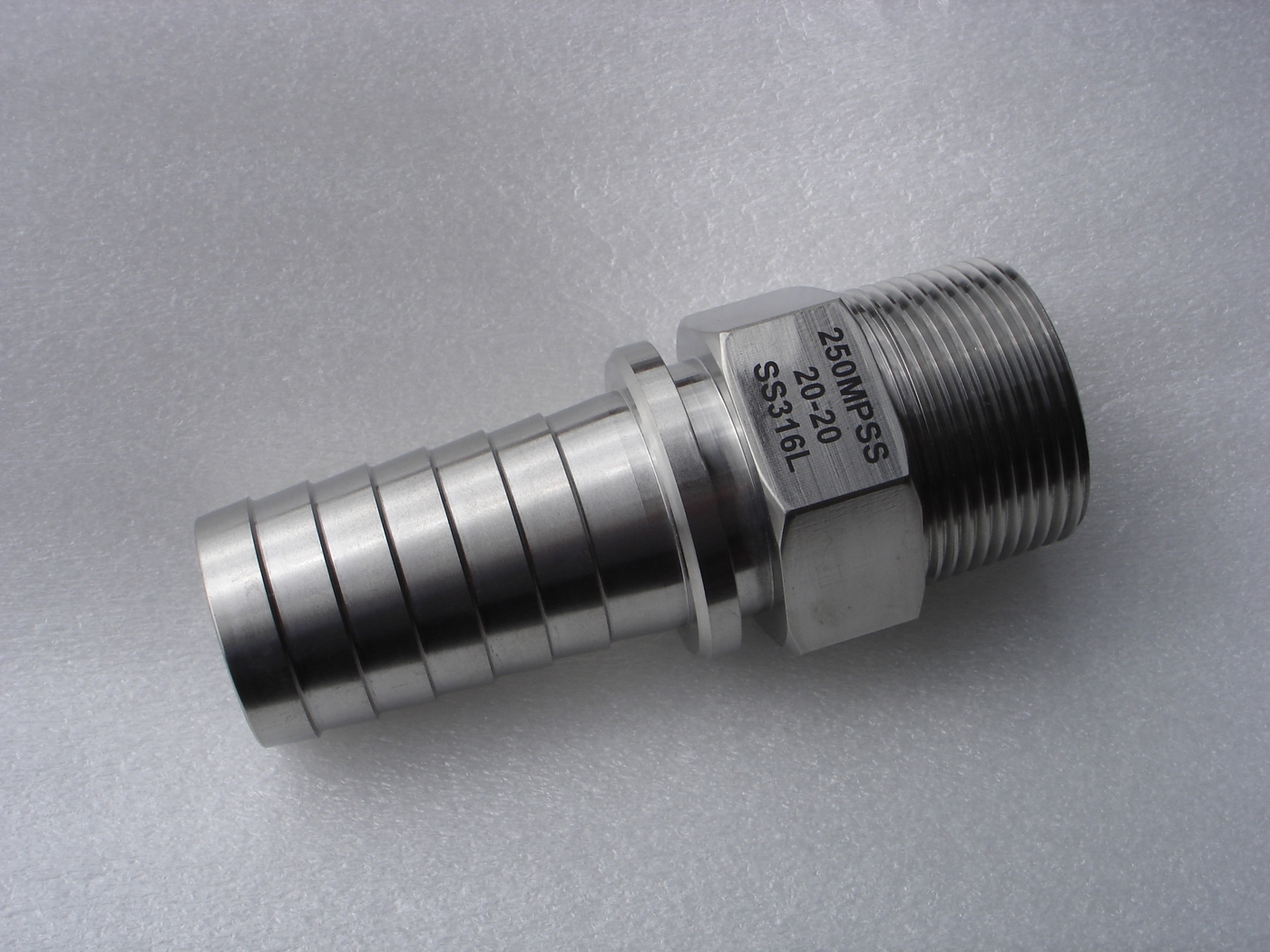
Laser on stainless steel

Metals can not be easily be engraved with common 10,600 nm wavelength CO_{2} lasers, on account of many metals having high reflectivity around this wavelength. Yb:Fiber Lasers, Nd:YVO_{4}, both emitting light of approximately 1000 nm wavelength, Nd:YAG lasers at 1,064 nm wavelength, or its harmonics at 532 and 355 nm, emit light that is more readily absorbed by most metals. They are thus more suitable for the laser engraving of metals.

=== Coated metals ===
The same conduction that works against the spot vaporisation of metal is an asset if the objective is to vaporise some other coating away from the metal. Laser engraving metal plates are manufactured with a finely polished metal, coated with an enamel paint made to be "burned off". At levels of 10 to 30 watts, excellent engravings are made as the enamel is removed quite cleanly. Much laser engraving is sold as exposed brass or silver-coated steel lettering on a black or dark-enamelled background. A wide variety of finishes are now available, including screen-printed marble effects on the enamel.

Anodized aluminum is commonly engraved or etched with CO_{2} laser machines. With power less than 40 W this metal can easily be engraved. The laser bleaches the color, exposing the white or silver aluminum substrate. Although it comes in various colors, laser engraving black anodized aluminum provides a deep contrast compared to other colors. Unlike most materials engraving anodized aluminum does not leave any smoke or residue.

Spray coatings can be obtained for the specific use of laser engraving metals, these sprays apply a coating that is visible to the laser light which fuses the coating to the substrate where the laser passed over. Typically, these sprays can also be used to engrave other optically invisible or reflective substances such as glass and are available in a variety of colours. Besides spray coatings, some laser-markable metals come pre-coated for imaging. Products such as this transform the surface of the metal to a different color (often black, brown or grey).

=== Stone and glass ===
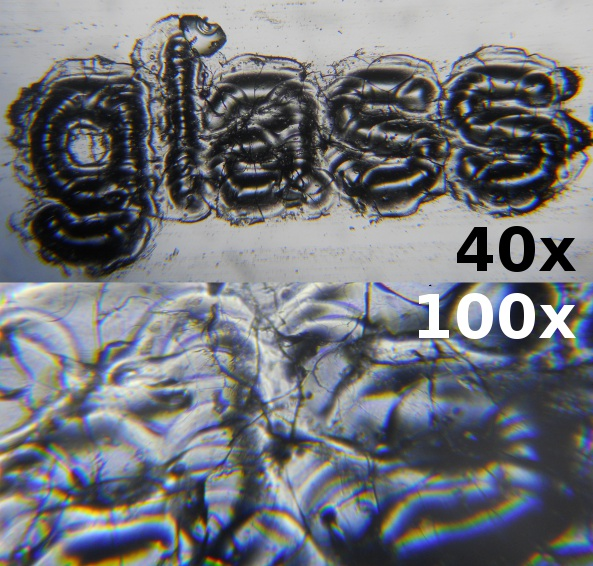
Laser engraved glass microscope slide with the word "glass" engraved in 3pt font. Magnified to 40x and 100x

Stone and glass do not vaporise or melt easily. As a result, this makes them generally a better candidate for other means of engraving, most notably sandblasting or cutting using diamonds and water. However, when a laser hits glass or stone, it fractures. Pores in the surface expose natural grains and crystalline "stubs" which, when heated very quickly, can separate a microscopic sized "chip" from the surface because the hot piece is expanding relative to its surroundings. One should avoid large "fill" areas in glass engraving because the results across an expanse tend to be uneven; the glass ablation simply cannot be depended on for visual consistency, which may be a disadvantage or an advantage depending on the circumstances and the desired effect. As of 2021, recent advances in UV laser technology now supply 10 W (or greater) of UV lasing energy and produce significantly better engraving results on glass than prior, lower powered iterations of UV laser marking systems (i.e. 3 W) or classic CO_{2} laser marking systems. The newer UV systems engrave cleanly and clearly without a high degree of micro-fracturing on the mark surface. Since modern 10 W UV laser systems heat the surrounding substrate less than other laser marking systems, glass substrates are significantly less prone to fracturing from the laser marking process. High quality fill engravings on thin glass and crystal substrates are now regularly reproducible at high-volume in full production environments.

== Jewelry ==
The demand for personalized jewelry has made jewellers more aware of the benefits of the laser engraving process.

Jewellers found that by using a laser, they could tackle an engraving task with greater precision. In fact, jewellers discovered that laser engraving allowed for more precision than other types of engraving. At the same time, jewellers discovered that laser applied engravings had a number of other desirable features. These features include the customization, personalization, and sheer beauty of these engravings.

Formerly, jewellers who attempted to do laser engraving needed to use large pieces of equipment. Now the devices that perform laser engraving come in smaller units. Some entrepreneurs have placed such units in mall kiosks. That has made laser engraving jewelry much more accessible. Such machines are specialized equipment, and can engrave the inside of a ring or the back of a watch.

A laser can cut into both flat and curved surfaces such as the surfaces on jewelry. That points out the reason why jewellers have welcomed all the adaptations for the creation of laser engraved jewelry.

== Fine art ==
Laser engraving can also be used to create works of fine art. Generally, this involves engraving into planar surfaces, to reveal lower levels of the surface or to create grooves and striations which can be filled with inks, glazes, or other materials. Some laser engravers have rotary attachments which can engrave around an object. Artists may digitize drawings, scan or create images on a computer, and engrave the image onto any of the materials cited in this article.

== Trophies, plaques and awards ==
The relatively low cost of laser engraving, driven by automation and inexpensive materials, makes it an ideal solution for personalization of trophies and awards. Whereas hand engraving may be a viable solution for more expensive champion's trophies, laser customization lends itself to team and participation trophies which are often ordered in quantity and carry relatively low margins.

Many also prefer the legibility afforded by a laser, which often delivers a crisper appearance than other methods at a much lower cost.

MOPA fiber lasers are an especially strong option for this type of engraving, due to its beam quality, waveform pulse control, and high power, which allows for a deep and durable mark.

Laserable materials, whether plastic or FlexiBrass, are available in a variety of colors, adding to the popularity of laser personalization for trophies and plaques. The two most popular combinations are gold lettering on a black background and black lettering on a gold background. While the same color combinations are common for plaques as well, the variety of colors used in plaque engraving is more varied.

== Laser etched mirrors ==
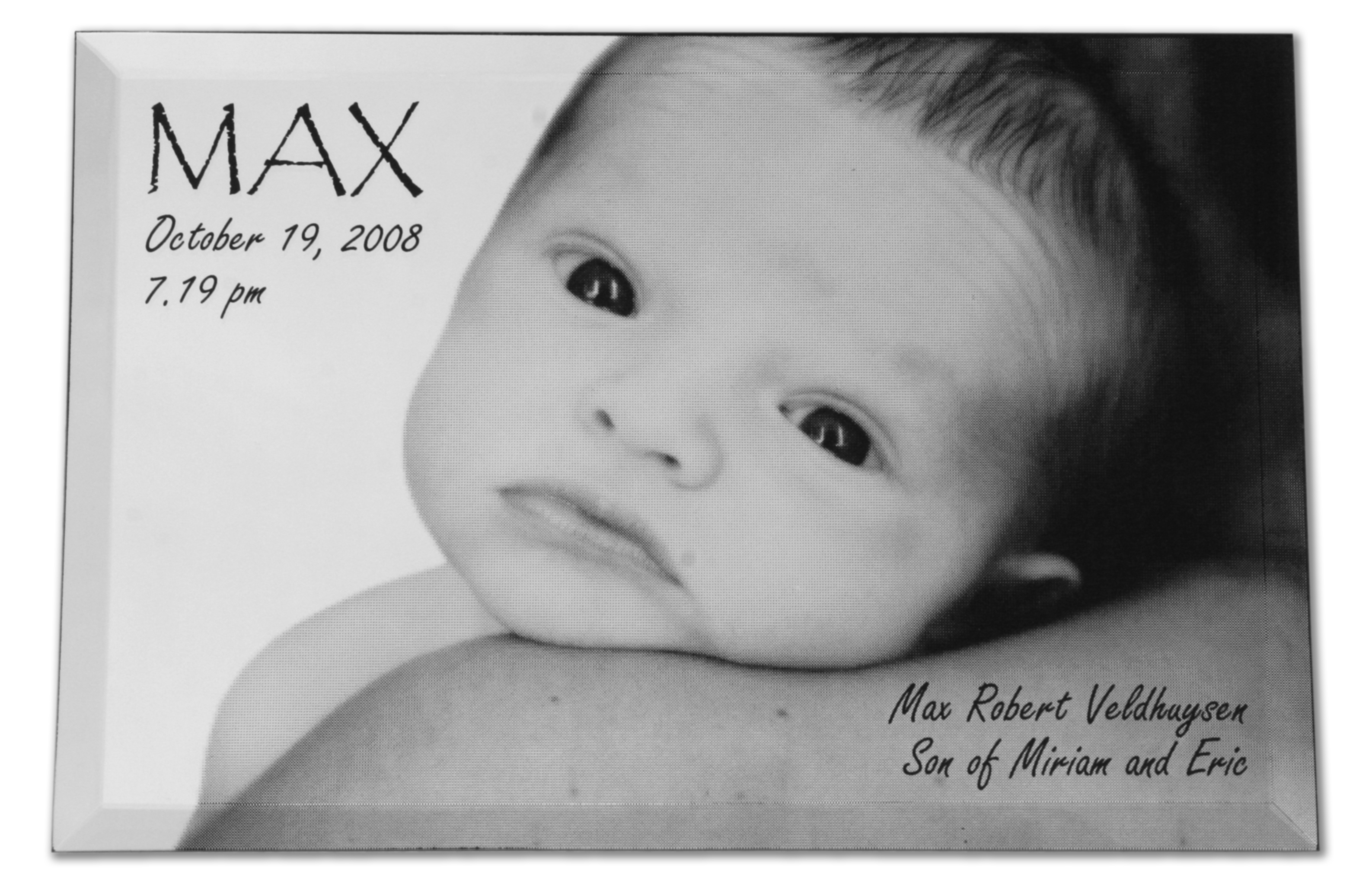
A laser engraved mirror

As with regular etched mirrors, the initial focus of laser engraving machines was to etch an image onto the glass surface of the mirror. When power, focus and speed are optimized, similar results to sandblasting or chemical etching can be achieved.

In a new form of mirror engraving the laser pulsates through the reflective silver layer at the rear of the mirror. As a result, the glass side of a laser engraved mirror remains intact, maintaining the full reflective qualities of the original mirror.

After the engraving process in finished, the rear of the mirror needs to be "filled" with a new coating to bring out the lasered detail. When a photograph or text is laser engraved, a rear coating of solid black will lend monochromatic images the greatest definition. Coloured coatings can supply chromaticity.

== Industrial applications ==
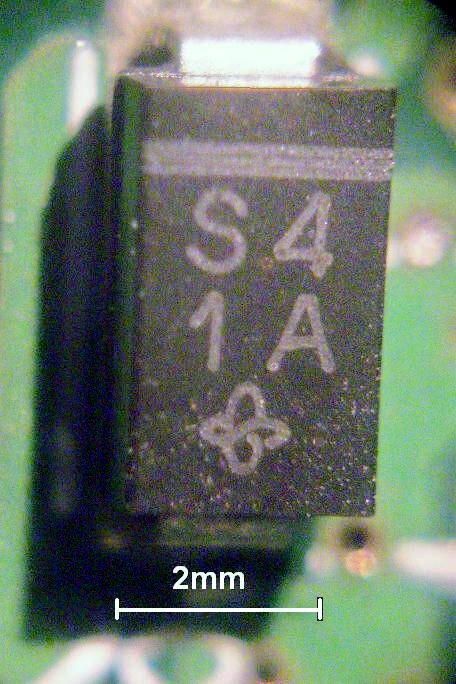
Laser marked electronic part

=== Direct laser engraving of flexographic plates and cylinders ===
Direct laser engraving of flexographic printing cylinders and plates has been an established process since the 1970s. This first began with the use of a carbon dioxide laser used to selectively ablate or evaporate a variety of rubber plate and sleeve materials to produce a print-ready surface without the use of photography or chemicals. With this process there is no integral ablation mask as with direct photopolymer laser imaging. Instead a high-power carbon dioxide laser head burns away, or ablates, unwanted material. The aim is to form sharp relief images with steep first relief and contoured shoulder supported edges to give a high-standard of process color reproduction. A short water wash and dry cycle follows, which is less complex than in the post-processing stages for direct laser imaging or conventional flexo platemaking using photopolymer plates. After engraving, the photopolymer is exposed through the imaged black layer and washed out in the traditional photopolymer process requiring photography and chemicals.

Before the year 2000, lasers only produced lower-quality results in rubber-like materials due to their rough structure. In the 2000s, fiber lasers were introduced, giving a much-increased engraving quality directly into black polymeric materials. At the Drupa 2004 printing exhibition, the direct engraving of polymer plates was introduced. This had also an effect on the rubber developers who, in order to stay competitive, developed new high quality rubber-like materials. The development of suitable polymeric compounds has also allowed the engraving quality achievable with the fiber lasers to be realized in print. Since then, direct laser engraving of flexo-printing forms is seen by many as the modern way to make printing forms for it is the first truly digital method.

As a competitive process, more recent laser systems have been introduced to selectively engrave the thin opaque black layer of a specially produced photopolymer plate or sleeve.

=== Direct photopolymer laser imaging ===
Closely related is the direct imaging of a digital flexo plates or sleeves "in the round" on a fast-rotating drum or cylinder. This is carried out on a platesetter integrated within a digital prepress workflow that also supports digital proofing. Again, this is a filmless process, which removes one of the variables in obtaining the fine and sharp dots for screened effects, including process color printing.

With this process, the electronically generated image is scanned at speed to a photopolymer plate material that carries a thin black mask layer on the surface. The infrared laser-imaging head, which runs parallel to the drum axis, ablates the integral mask to reveal the uncured polymer underneath. A main ultraviolet exposure follows to form the image through the mask. The remaining black layer absorbs the ultraviolet radiation, which polymerizes the underlying photopolymer where the black layer has been removed. The exposed digital plate still needs to be processed like a conventional flexo plate. That is, using solvent-based washout with the necessary waste recovery techniques, although some water-washable digital plates are in development. This technology has been used since 1995 and is only now becoming more widely used around the world as more affordable equipment becomes available. Trade sources say there are around 650 digital platesetters installed in label, packaging and trade platemaking houses.

=== Laser engraving of anilox rolls ===
Prior to 1980, anilox rolls were produced by a variety of mechanical processes. These metal anilox rolls were sometimes sprayed with ceramic to prolong their life in the flexographic printing press. During the 1980s laser engraving systems were produced which used a carbon dioxide laser to engrave the required cell pattern directly into the polished ceramic surface. Since then Q-switched YAG lasers were used for a period as they provided a more focusable laser beam as well as increased pulsing frequencies capable of engraving the finer cell configuration demanded by the ever-evolving flexographic printing process. Since approximately the year 2000 the direct anilox laser engraving process has been dominated by the use of fibre lasers which provide the high powers of the carbon dioxide lasers together with the finely focusable beam of the YAG lasers. Optical systems providing the rapid switching of multiple beams have allowed the fibre laser system to be dominant in this market. This technology has become known as Multi-Beam-Anilox or MBA.

=== Sub-surface laser engraving (SSLE) ===
Sub-surface laser engraving is the process of engraving an image in a transparent solid material by focusing a laser below the surface to create small fractures. Such engraved materials are of high-grade optical quality (suitable for lenses, with low dispersion) to minimize distortion of the beam. BK7 glass is a common material for this application. Plastics are also used, but with far less desirable results when compared to the engraving done in optical crystal.

Since its commercial application in the late 1990s, SSLE has become more cost-effective with a number of different sized machines ranging from small (~US$35,000–60,000) to large production-scale tables (>US$250,000). Although these machines are becoming more available, it is estimated that only a few hundred are in operation worldwide. Many machines require very expensive cooling, maintenance and calibration for proper use. The more popular SSLE engraving machines use the Diode Pumped Solid State or DPSS laser process. The laser diode, the primary component which excites a pulsed solid state laser, can easily cost one third of the machine itself and functions for a limited number of hours, although a good quality diode can last thousands of hours.

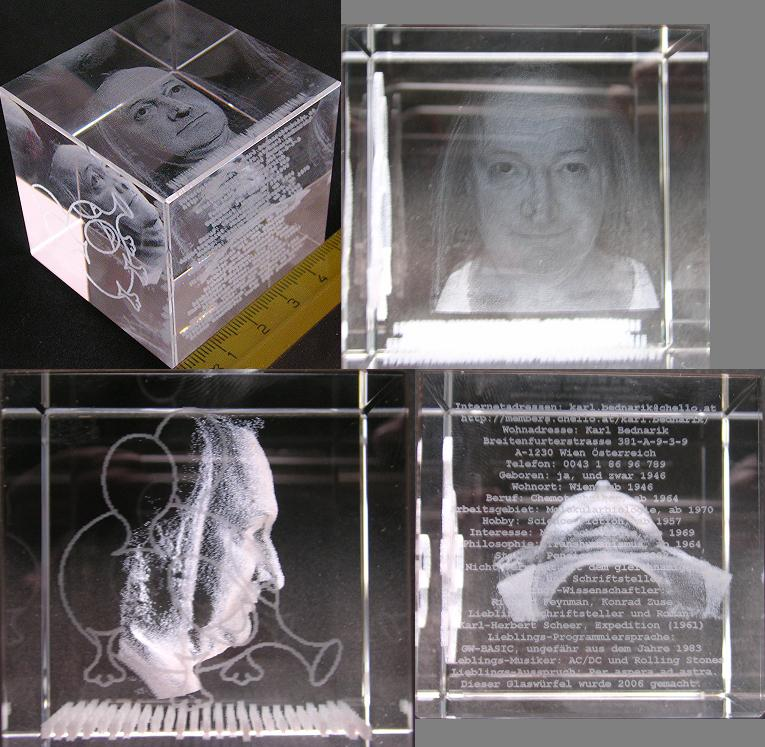
A 3D image engraved in a glass cube, seen from various angles

Since 2009, use of SSLE has become more cost effective to produce 3D images in souvenir 'crystal' or promotional items with only a few designers concentrating on designs incorporating large or monolithic sized crystal. A number of companies offer custom-made souvenirs, called bubblegrams or laser crystals, by taking 3D pictures or photos and engraving them into the crystal.

== See also ==
- Glass etching – Decorating glass by etching
- Laser ablation – Process that removes material from an object by heating it with a laser
- Laser beam machining – Use of laser beams to remove material from a workpiece
- Laser bonding – Method to mark surfaces
- Laser cutting – Technology that uses a laser to cut materials
- List of laser articles
