= Laser ablation =

Process that removes material from an object by heating it with a laser

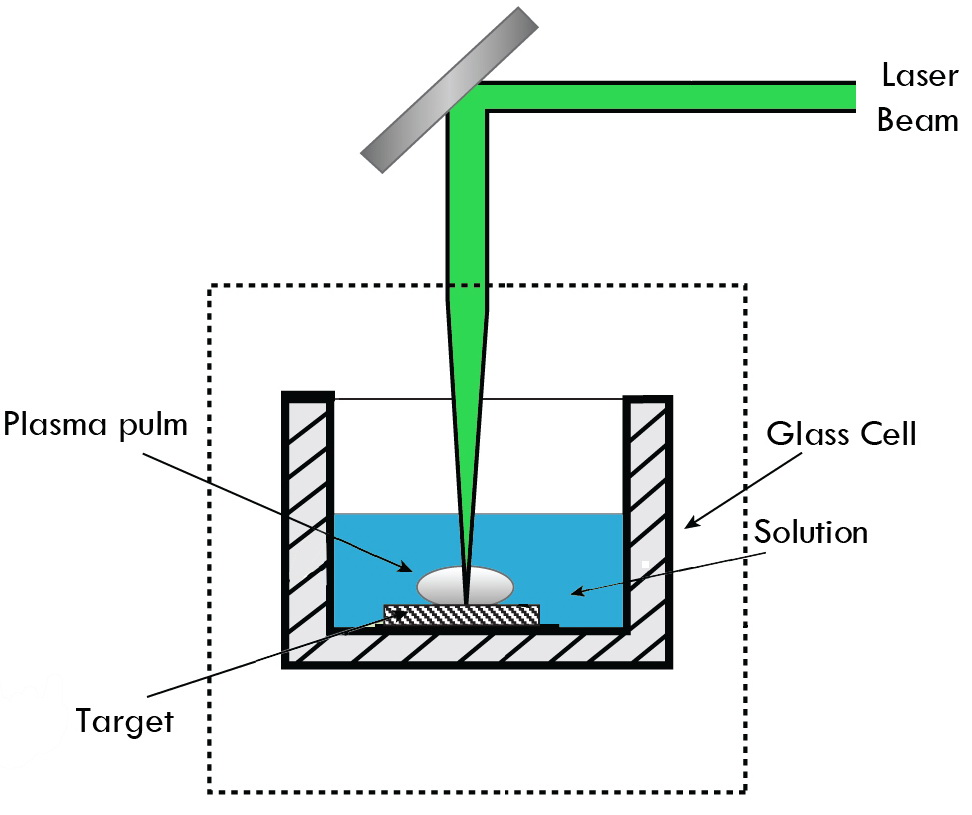
Preparation of nanoparticles by laser in solution

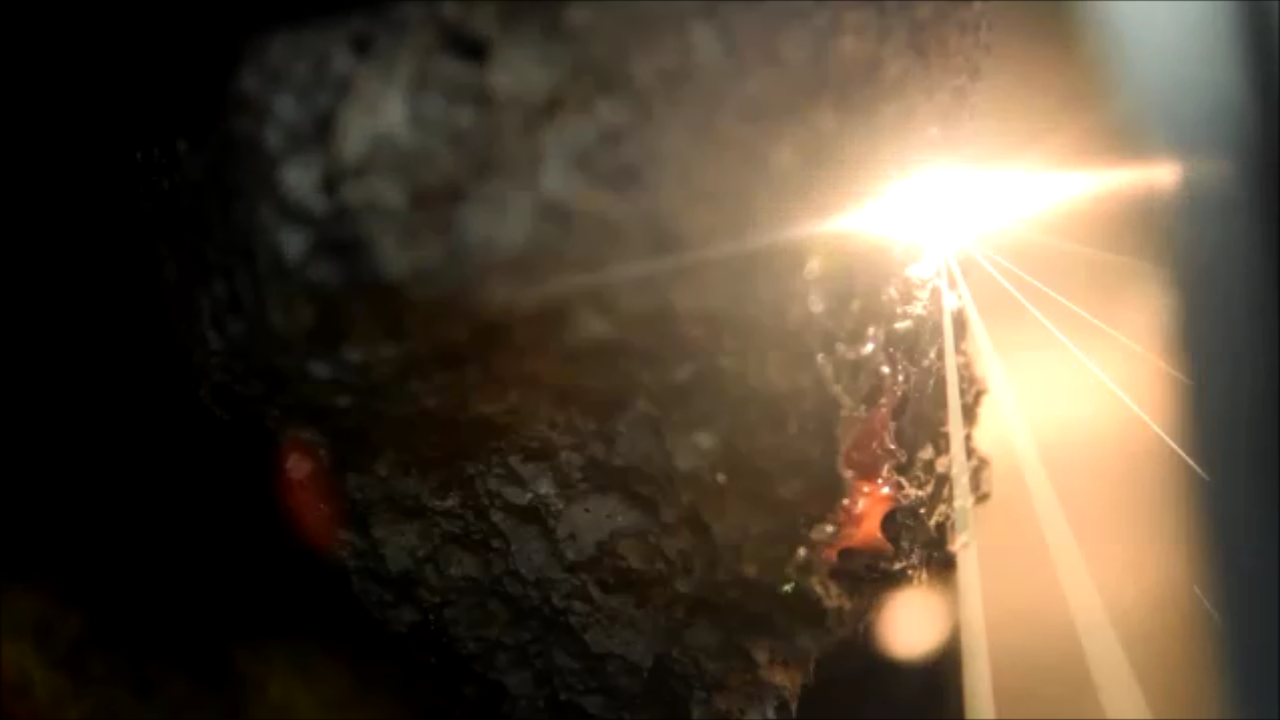
Laser ablation of an asteroid-like sample

Laser ablation or photoablation (also called laser blasting) is the process of removing material from a solid (or occasionally liquid) surface by irradiating it with a laser beam. At low laser flux, the material is heated by the absorbed laser energy and evaporates or sublimates. At high laser flux, the material is typically converted to a plasma.

Usually, laser ablation refers to removing material with a pulsed laser, but it is possible to ablate material with a continuous wave laser beam if the laser intensity is high enough. While relatively long laser pulses (e.g. nanosecond pulses) can heat and thermally alter or damage the processed material, ultrashort laser pulses (e.g. femtoseconds) cause only minimal material damage during processing due to the ultrashort light–matter interaction and are therefore also suitable for micromaterial processing. Excimer lasers of deep ultra-violet light are mainly used in photoablation; the wavelength of laser used in photoablation is approximately 200 nm.

== Fundamentals ==
The depth over which the laser energy is absorbed, and thus the amount of material removed by a single laser pulse, depends on the material's optical properties and the laser wavelength and pulse length. The total mass ablated from the target per laser pulse is usually referred to as ablation rate. Such features of laser radiation as laser beam scanning velocity and the covering of scanning lines can significantly influence the ablation process.

Laser pulses can vary over a very wide range of duration (milliseconds to femtoseconds) and fluxes, and can be precisely controlled. This makes laser ablation very valuable for both research and industrial applications.

== Applications ==
The simplest application of laser ablation is to remove material from a solid surface in a controlled fashion. Laser machining and particularly laser drilling are examples; pulsed lasers can drill extremely small, deep holes through very hard materials. Very short laser pulses remove material so quickly that the surrounding material absorbs very little heat, so laser drilling can be done on delicate or heat-sensitive materials, including tooth enamel (laser dentistry). Several workers have employed laser ablation and gas condensation to produce nano particles of metal, metal oxides and metal carbides.

Also, laser energy can be selectively absorbed by coatings, particularly on metal, so CO_{2} or Nd:YAG pulsed lasers can be used to clean surfaces, remove paint or coating, or prepare surfaces for painting without damaging the underlying surface. High power lasers clean a large spot with a single pulse. Lower power lasers use many small pulses which may be scanned across an area. In some industries laser ablation may be referred to as laser cleaning.

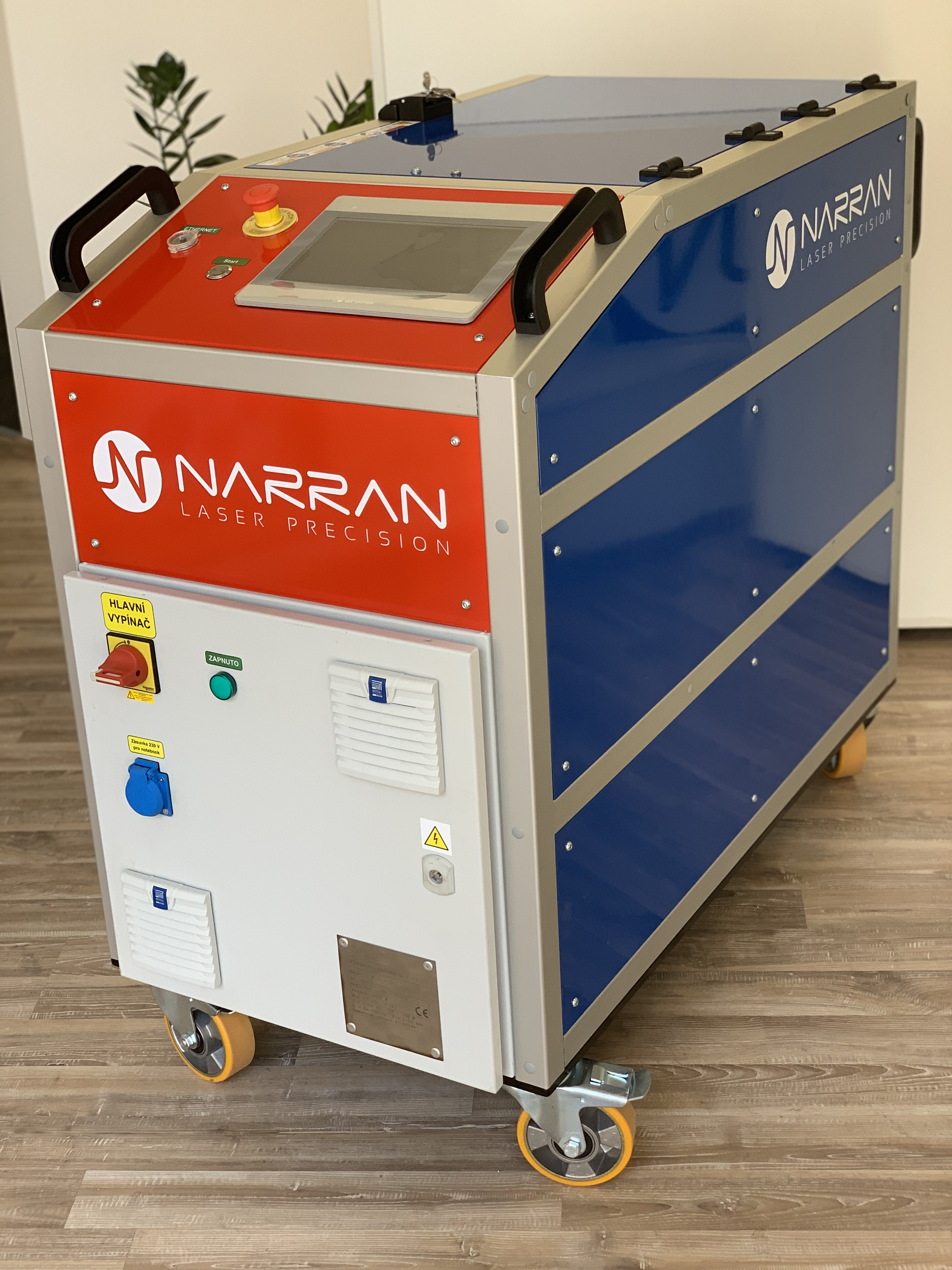
Industrial 500W cleaning laser

One of the advantages is that no solvents are used, therefore it is environmentally friendly and operators are not exposed to chemicals (assuming nothing harmful is vaporized). It is relatively easy to automate. The running costs are lower than dry media or dry-ice blasting, although the capital investment costs are much higher. The process is gentler than abrasive techniques, e.g. carbon fibres within a composite material are not damaged. Heating of the target is minimal.

Another class of applications uses laser ablation to process the material removed into new forms either not possible or difficult to produce by other means. A recent example is the production of carbon nanotubes.

Laser cleaning is also used for efficient rust removal from iron objects; oil or grease removal from various surfaces; restoration of paintings, sculptures, frescoes. Laser ablation is one of preferred techniques for rubber mold cleaning due to minimal surface damage to the mold.

In March 1995 Guo et al. were the first to report the use of a laser to ablate a block of pure graphite, and later graphite mixed with catalytic metal. The catalytic metal can consist of elements such as cobalt, niobium, platinum, nickel, copper, or a binary combination thereof. The composite block is formed by making a paste of graphite powder, carbon cement, and the metal. The paste is next placed in a cylindrical mold and baked for several hours. After solidification, the graphite block is placed inside an oven with a laser pointed at it, and argon gas is pumped along the direction of the laser point. The oven temperature is approximately 1200 °C. As the laser ablates the target, carbon nanotubes form and are carried by the gas flow onto a cool copper collector. Like carbon nanotubes formed using the electric-arc discharge technique, carbon nanotube fibers are deposited in a haphazard and tangled fashion. Single-walled nanotubes are formed from the block of graphite and metal catalyst particles, whereas multi-walled nanotubes form from the pure graphite starting material.

A variation of this type of application is to use laser ablation to create coatings by ablating the coating material from a source and letting it deposit on the surface to be coated; this is a special type of physical vapor deposition called pulsed laser deposition (PLD), and can create coatings from materials that cannot readily be evaporated any other way. This process is used to manufacture some types of high temperature superconductor and laser crystals.

Remote laser spectroscopy uses laser ablation to create a plasma from the surface material; the composition of the surface can be determined by analyzing the wavelengths of light emitted by the plasma.

Laser ablation is also used to create pattern, removing selectively coating from dichroic filter. This products are used in stage lighting for high dimensional projections, or for calibration of machine vision's instruments.

=== Propulsion ===
Finally, laser ablation can be used to transfer momentum to a surface, since the ablated material applies a pulse of high pressure to the surface underneath it as it expands. The effect is similar to hitting the surface with a hammer. This process is used in industry to work-harden metal surfaces, and is one damage mechanism for a laser weapon. It is also the basis of pulsed laser propulsion for spacecraft.

=== Manufacturing ===
Processes are currently being developed to use laser ablation in the removal of thermal barrier coating on high-pressure gas turbine components. Due to the low heat input, TBC removal can be completed with minimal damage to the underlying metallic coatings and parent material.

=== 2D materials production ===
Laser ablation in the liquid phase is an efficient method to exfoliate bulk materials into their 2-dimensional (2D) forms, such as black phosphorus. By changing the solvent and laser energy, the thickness and lateral size of the 2D materials can be controlled.

=== Chemical analysis ===
Laser ablation is used as a sampling method for elemental and isotopic analysis, and replaces traditional laborious procedures generally required for digesting solid samples in acid solutions. Laser ablation sampling is detected by monitoring the photons emitted at the sample surface - a technology referred to as LIBS (Laser Induced Breakdown Spectroscopy) and LAMIS (Laser Ablation Molecular Isotopic Spectrometry), or by transporting the ablated mass particles to a secondary excitation source, like the inductively coupled plasma. Both mass spectroscopy (MS) and optical emission spectroscopy (OES) can be coupled with the ICP. The benefits of laser ablation sampling for chemical analysis include no sample preparation, no waste, minimal sample requirements, no vacuum requirements, rapid sample-analysis turn-around time, spatial (depth and lateral) resolution, and chemical mapping. Laser ablation chemical analysis is viable for practically all industries, such as mining, geochemistry, energy, environmental, industrial processing, food safety, forensic and biological. Commercial instruments are available for all markets to measure every element and isotope within a sample. Some instruments combine both optical and mass detection to extend the analysis coverage, and dynamic range in sensitivity Commercial instruments are available for all markets to measure every element and isotope within a sample. Some instruments combine both optical and mass detection to extend the analysis coverage, and dynamic range in sensitivity. Companies like Allied Scientific Pro offer a range of advanced laser ablation systems for both industrial and laboratory applications, supporting precise material analysis and processing.

=== Biology ===
Laser ablation is used in science to destroy nerves and other tissues to study their function. For example, a species of pond snail, Helisoma trivolvis, can have their sensory neurons laser ablated off when the snail is still an embryo to prevent use of those nerves.

Another example is the trochophore larva of Platynereis dumerilii, where the larval eye was ablated and the larvae was not phototactic, anymore. However phototaxis in the nectochaete larva of Platynereis dumerilii is not mediated by the larval eyes, because the larva is still phototactic, even if the larval eyes are ablated. But if the adult eyes are ablated, then the nectochaete is not phototactic anymore and thus phototaxis in the nectochaete larva is mediated by the adult eyes.

Laser ablation can also be used to destroy individual cells during embryogenesis of an organism, like Platynereis dumerilii, to study the effect of missing cells during development.

=== Medicine ===
There are several laser types used in medicine for ablation, including argon, carbon dioxide (CO_{2}), dye, erbium, excimer, Nd:YAG, and others. Laser ablation is used in a variety of medical specialties including ophthalmology, general surgery, neurosurgery, ENT, dentistry, oral and maxillofacial surgery, and veterinary. Laser scalpels are used for ablation in both hard- and soft-tissue surgeries. Some of the most common procedures where laser ablation is used include LASIK, skin resurfacing, cavity preparation, biopsies, and tumor and lesion removal. In hard-tissue surgeries, the short pulsed lasers, such as Er:YAG or Nd:YAG, ablate tissue under stress or inertial confinement conditions. In soft-tissue surgeries, the CO_{2} laser beam ablates and cauterizes simultaneously, making it the most practical and most common soft-tissue laser.

Laser ablation can be used on benign and malignant lesions in various organs, which is called laser-induced interstitial thermotherapy. The main applications currently involve the reduction of benign thyroid nodules and destruction of primary and secondary malignant liver lesions.

Laser ablation is also used to treat chronic venous insufficiency.

See also ablative brain surgery.

== Mechanism ==
=== Material dynamics ===
A well-established framework for laser ablation is called the two-temperature model by Kaganov and Anisimov. In it, the energy from the laser pulse is absorbed by the solid material, directly stimulating the motion of the electrons and transferring heat to the lattice, which underlies the crystalline structure of the solid. Thus, the two variables are: the electron temperature itself $T_e$ and the lattice temperature $T_l$. Their differential equations, as a function of the depth $x$, are given by

$$c_e \frac{\partial T_e}{\partial t} = \frac{\partial }{\partial x} \left(\kappa_e \frac{\partial T_e}{\partial x}\right) - K_{e,l} (T_e - T_l) + Q(t) ,$$

$$c_l \frac{\partial T_l}{\partial t} = K_{e,l} (T_e - T_l) .$$

Here, $c_e$ and $c_l$ are the specific heat of the electrons and the lattice respectively, $\kappa_e$ is the electron thermal conductivity, $K_{e,l}$ is the thermal coupling between the electron and (lattice) phonon systems, and $Q(t)$ is the laser pulse energy absorbed by the bulk, usually characterized by the fluence. Some approximations can be made depending on the laser parameters and their relation to the time scales of the thermal processes in the target, which vary between the target being metallic or a dielectric.

One of the most important experimental parameters for characterization of a target is the ablation threshold, which is the minimum fluence at which a particular atom or molecule is observed in the ablation plume. This threshold depends on the wavelength of the laser, and can be simulated assuming the Lennard-Jones potential between the atoms in the lattice, and only during a particular time of the temperature evolution called the hydrodynamic stage. Typically, however, this value is experimentally determined.

The two-temperature model can be extended on a case-by-case basis. One notable extension involves the generation of plasma. For ultra-short pulses (which suggest a large fluence) it has been proposed that Coulomb explosion also plays a role because the laser energy is high enough to generate ions in the ablation plume. A value for the electric field has been determined for the Coulomb-explosion threshold, and is given by

$$E = \sqrt{ \frac {2 \Lambda n_0 }{ \epsilon \epsilon_0 } } ,$$

where $\Lambda$ is the sublimation energy per atom, $n_0$ is the atomic lattice density and $\epsilon$ is the dielectric permittivity.

=== Plume dynamics ===
Some applications of pulsed laser ablation focus on the machining and the finish of the ablated material, but other applications are interested in the material ejected from the target. In this case, the characteristics of the ablation plume are more important to model.

Anisimov's theory considered an elliptical gas cloud growing in vacuum. In this model, thermal expansion dominates the initial dynamics, with little influence from the kinetic energy, but the mathematical expression is subject to assumptions and conditions in the experimental setup. Parameters such as surface finish, preconditioning of a spot on the target, or the angle of the laser beam with respect to the normal of the target surface are factors to take into account when observing the angle of divergence of the plume dynamics or its yield.

== See also ==
- Asteroid laser ablation
- Dental laser
- Laser induced breakdown spectroscopy
- LASEK
- LASIK
- Laser bonding
- Laser cutting
- Laser engraving
- Laser scalpel
- Laser surgery
  - Soft-tissue laser surgery
- List of laser articles
- Matrix-assisted laser desorption/ionization
- Parts cleaning
- Optical breakdown photoionization mode (OB) at Photoionization mode
- Soft retooling

== Bibliography ==
- Oxford Concise Medical Dictionary, 2002, 6th edition, ISBN 0-19-860459-9
