= Bubblegram =

Solid block of glass or plastic exposed to lasers to generate 3D design inside

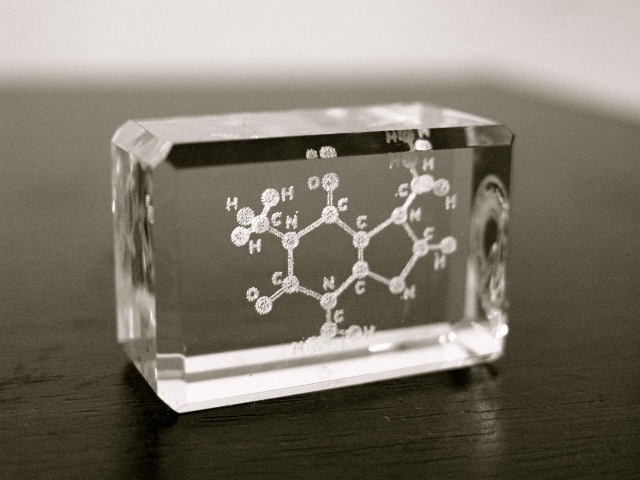
A laser glass sculpture of a caffeine molecule

A bubblegram (also known as laser crystal, Subsurface Laser Engraving, 3D crystal engraving or vitrography) is a solid block of glass or transparent plastic that has been exposed to laser beams to generate three-dimensional designs inside. The image is composed of many small points of fracture or other visible deformations and appears to float inside the block.

== Description ==
Each point is created by a laser beam focused to high intensity at that location by a computer-controlled opto-mechanical system. A complex or highly detailed image occupying a 5 cm (2 inch) cubic volume typically requires the creation of tens of thousands of such points.

Bubblegram images may be created by intersecting laser beams in appropriately doped plastic to induce a chemical reaction via heat or photonic excitation, creating bubbles or nodes where the plastic has a different index of refraction.

Glass block bubblegrams of Russian origin entered international commerce as a novelty in the late 1990s, but high prices and the predominantly simple, inartistic subject matter severely limited market penetration. In the early 2000s, a much less expensive, more visually appealing and highly diverse array of Chinese-made bubblegram novelties achieved wide commercial success in the United States, to the extent of becoming a fad: representations of monuments, corporate symbols, religious imagery, mythical creatures and nature scenes appeared in gift shops.

== See also ==
- Laser engraving
- Volumetric printing
