= Excimer laser =

Type of ultraviolet laser important in chip manufacturing and eye surgery

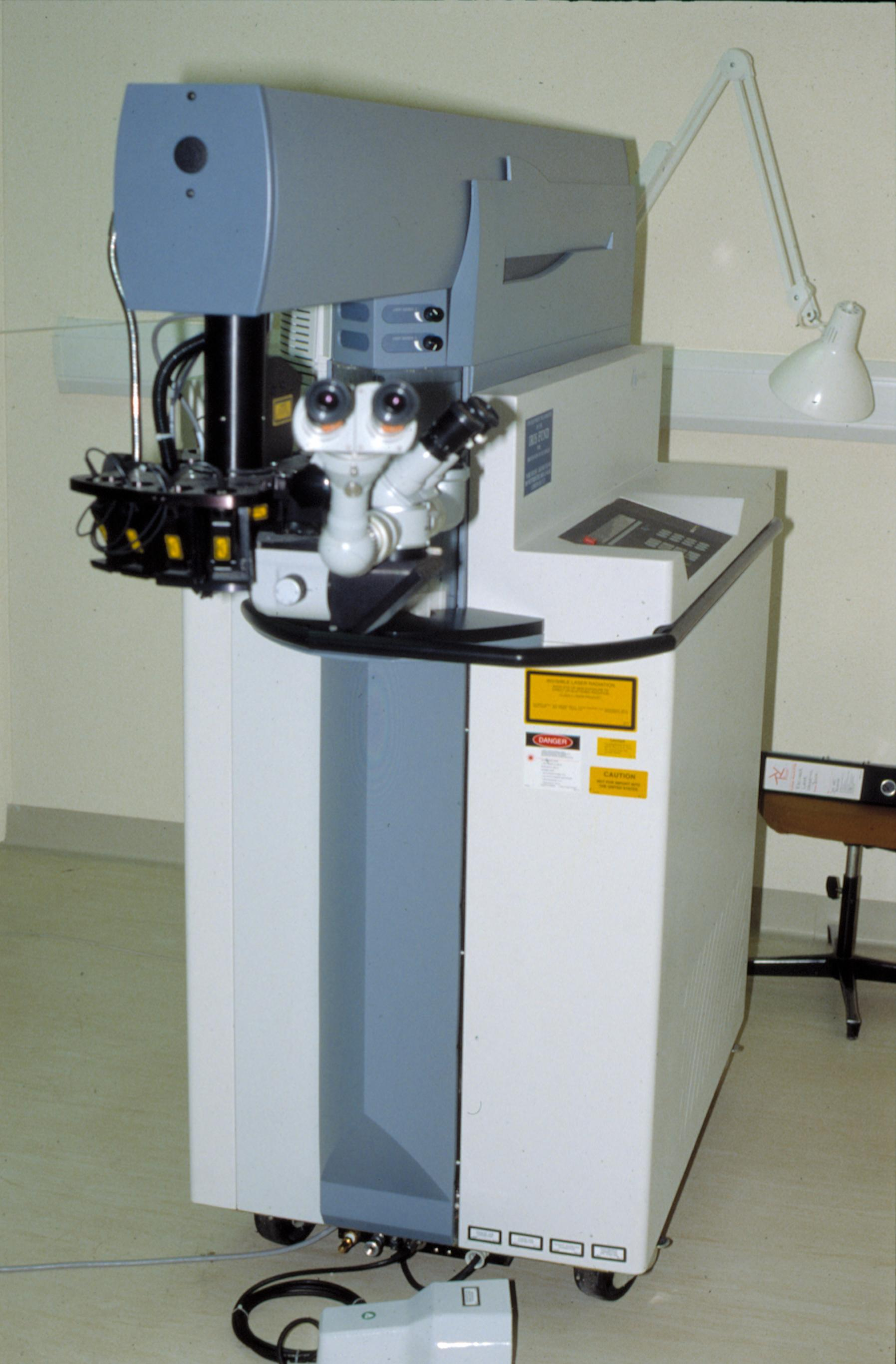
An excimer laser

An excimer laser, sometimes more correctly called an exciplex laser, is a form of ultraviolet laser which is commonly used in the production of microelectronic devices, semiconductor based integrated circuits or "chips", eye surgery, and micromachining.

Since the 1990s, excimer lasers have been widely used in high-resolution photolithography machines, one of the critical technologies required for microelectronic chip manufacturing.

== Terminology and history ==
The Electra KrF laser demonstrates 90,000 shots over 10 hours

The term excimer is short for excited dimer, while exciplex is short for excited complex. Most excimer lasers are of the noble gas halide type, for which the term excimer is, strictly speaking, a misnomer.

The excimer laser was proposed in 1960 by Fritz Houtermans. Excimer laser development started with the observation of a nascent spectral line narrowing at 176 nm reported in 1971 by Nikolai Basov, V. A. Danilychev and Yu. M. Popov, at the Lebedev Physical Institute in Moscow, using liquid xenon dimer (Xe_{2}) excited by an electron beam. Spurred by this report, H.A. Koehler et al. presented a better substantiation of stimulated emission in 1972, using high pressure xenon gas. Definitive evidence of a xenon excimer laser action at 173 nm using a high pressure gas at 12 atmospheres, also pumped by an electron beam, was first presented in March 1973, by Mani Lal Bhaumik of Northrop Corporation, Los Angeles. Strong stimulated emission was observed as the laser's spectral line narrowed from a continuum of 15 nm to just 0.25 nm, and the intensity increased a thousand-fold. The laser's estimated output of 1 joule was high enough to evaporate part of the mirror coatings, which imprinted its mode pattern. This presentation established the credible potential of developing high power lasers at short wavelengths.

A later improvement was the use of noble gas halides (originally Xe Br) developed by many groups in 1975. These groups include the Avco Everett Research Laboratory, Sandia Laboratories, the Northrop Research and Technology Center, the United States Government's Naval Research Laboratory, which also developed a XeCl Laser that was excited using a microwave discharge, and Los Alamos National Laboratory.

== Construction and operation ==
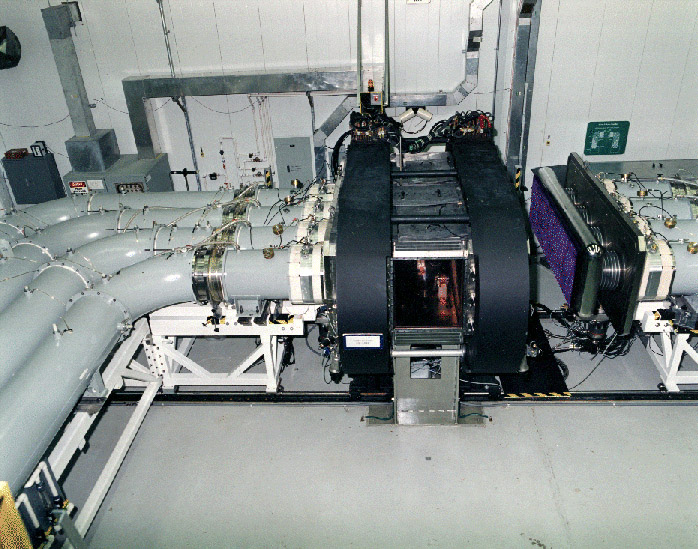
Final amplifier of the Nike laser where laser beam energy is increased from 150 J to ~5 kJ by passing through a krypton/fluorine/argon gas mixture excited by irradiation with two opposing 670,000 volt electron beams.

An excimer laser typically uses a combination of a noble gas (argon, krypton, or xenon) and a reactive gas (fluorine or chlorine). Under the appropriate conditions of electrical stimulation and high pressure, a pseudo-molecule called an excimer (or in the case of noble gas halides, exciplex) is created, which can only exist in an energized state and can give rise to laser light in the ultraviolet range.

Laser action in an excimer molecule occurs because it has a bound (associative) excited state, but a repulsive (dissociative) ground state. Noble gases such as xenon and krypton are highly inert and do not usually form chemical compounds. However, when in an excited state (induced by electrical discharge or high-energy electron beams), they can form temporarily bound molecules with themselves (excimer) or with halogens (exciplex) such as fluorine and chlorine. The excited compound can release its excess energy by undergoing spontaneous or stimulated emission, resulting in a strongly repulsive ground state molecule which very quickly (on the order of a picosecond) dissociates back into two unbound atoms. This forms a population inversion.

=== Wavelength determination ===
The wavelength of an excimer laser depends on the molecules used, and is usually in the ultraviolet range of electromagnetic radiation:

Excimer	Wavelength	Relative power
Ar_{2}*	126 nm	
Kr_{2}*	146 nm	
F_{2}*	157 nm	
Xe_{2}*	172 & 175 nm	
ArF	193 nm	60
KrCl	222 nm	25
KrF	248 nm	100
XeBr	282 nm	
XeCl	308 nm	50
XeF	351 nm	45

Excimer lasers, such as XeF and KrF, can also be made slightly tunable using a variety of prism and grating intracavity arrangements.

=== Pulse repetition rate ===
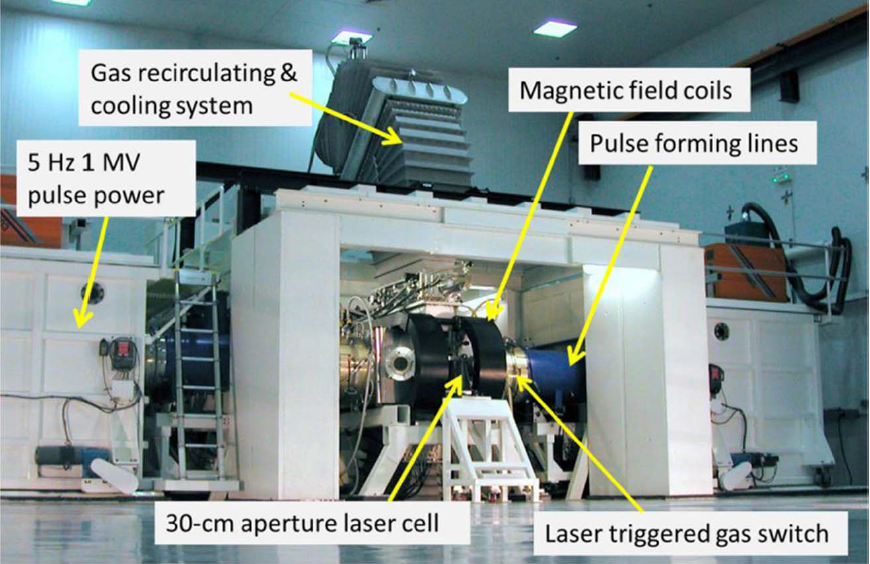
The electra laser at NRL is a KrF laser that demonstrated over 90,000 shots in 10 hours.

While electron-beam pumped excimer lasers can produce high single energy pulses, they are generally separated by long time periods (many minutes). An exception was the Electra system, designed for inertial fusion studies, which could produce a burst of 10 pulses each measuring 500 J over a span of 10 s. In contrast, discharge-pumped excimer lasers, also first demonstrated at the Naval Research Laboratory, are able to output a steady stream of pulses. Their significantly higher pulse repetition rates (of order 100 Hz) and smaller footprint made possible the bulk of the applications listed in the following section. A series of industrial lasers were developed at XMR, Inc in Santa Clara, California between 1980 and 1988. Most of the lasers produced were XeCl, and a sustained energy of 1 J per pulse at repetition rates of 300 pulses per second was the standard rating. This laser used a high power thyratron and magnetic switching with corona pre-ionization and was rated for 100 million pulses without major maintenance. The operating gas was a mixture of xenon, HCl, and neon at approximately 5 atmospheres. Extensive use of stainless steel, nickel plating, and solid nickel electrodes was incorporated to reduce corrosion due to the HCl gas. One major problem encountered was degradation of the optical windows due to carbon build-up on the surface of the CaF window. This was due to hydro-chloro-carbons formed from small amounts of carbon in O-rings reacting with the HCl gas. The hydro-chloro-carbons would slowly increase over time, and absorbed the laser light, causing a slow reduction in laser energy. In addition, these compounds would decompose in the intense laser beam, and collect on the window, causing a further reduction in energy. Periodic replacement of laser gas and windows was required at considerable expense. This was significantly improved by use of a gas purification system consisting of a cold trap operating slightly above liquid nitrogen temperature, and a metal bellows pump to recirculate the laser gas through the cold trap. The cold trap consisted of a liquid nitrogen reservoir and a heater to raise the temperature slightly, since at 77 K (liquid nitrogen boiling point) the xenon vapor pressure was lower than the required operating pressure in the laser gas mixture. HCl was frozen out in the cold trap, and additional HCl was added to maintain the proper gas ratio. An interesting side effect of this was a slow increase in laser energy over time, attributed to increase in hydrogen partial pressure in the gas mixture caused by slow reaction of chlorine with various metals. As the chlorine reacted, hydrogen was released, increasing the partial pressure. The net result was the same as adding hydrogen to the mixture to increase laser efficiency, as reported by T.J. McKee et al.

== Major applications ==
=== Photolithography ===
Since the 1960s the most widespread industrial application of excimer lasers has been in deep-ultraviolet photolithography, a critical technology used in the manufacturing of microelectronic devices. Historically, from the early 1960s through the mid-1980s, mercury-xenon lamps were used in lithography for their spectral lines at 436, 405 and 365 nm wavelengths. However, with the semiconductor industry's need for both higher resolution (to produce denser and faster chips) and higher throughput (for lower costs), the lamp-based lithography tools were no longer able to meet the industry's requirements. This challenge was overcome when in a pioneering development in 1982, deep-UV excimer laser lithography was proposed and demonstrated at IBM by Kanti Jain. From an even broader scientific and technological perspective, since the invention of the laser in 1960, the development of excimer laser lithography has been highlighted as one of the major milestones in the history of the laser.

Current lithography tools (as of 2021) mostly use deep ultraviolet (DUV) light from the KrF and ArF excimer lasers with wavelengths of 248 and 193 nanometers (called "excimer laser lithography"), which has enabled transistor feature sizes to shrink to 7 nanometers (see below). Excimer laser lithography has thus played a critical role in the continued advance of the so-called Moore's law for the last 25 years. By around 2020, extreme ultraviolet lithography (EUV) has started to replace excimer laser lithography to further improve the resolution of the semiconductor circuits lithography process.

=== Fusion ===
The Naval Research Laboratory built two systems, the Krypton fluoride laser (248 nm) and the Argon fluoride laser (193 nm) to test approaches to prove out Inertial Confinement Fusion approaches. These were the Electra and Nike laser systems. Because the excimer laser is a gas-based system, the laser does not heat up like solid-state systems such as National Ignition Facility and the Omega Laser. Electra demonstrated 90,000 shots in 10 hours; ideal for an Inertial fusion power plant.

=== Medical uses ===
The ultraviolet light from an excimer laser is well absorbed by biological matter and organic compounds. Rather than burning or cutting material, the excimer laser adds enough energy to disrupt the molecular bonds of the surface tissue, which effectively disintegrates into the air in a tightly controlled manner through ablation rather than burning. Thus excimer lasers have the useful property that they can remove exceptionally fine layers of surface material with almost no heating or change to the remainder of the material which is left intact. These properties make excimer lasers well suited to precision micromachining organic material (including certain polymers and plastics), or delicate surgeries such as LASIK eye surgery. In 1980–1983, Rangaswamy Srinivasan, Samuel Blum and James J. Wynne at IBM's T. J. Watson Research Center observed the effect of the ultraviolet excimer laser on biological materials. Intrigued, they investigated further, finding that the laser made clean, precise cuts that would be ideal for delicate surgeries. This resulted in a fundamental patent and Srinivasan, Blum and Wynne were elected to the National Inventors Hall of Fame in 2002. In 2012, the team members were honored with National Medal of Technology and Innovation by US President Barack Obama for their work related to the excimer laser. Subsequent work introduced the excimer laser for use in angioplasty. Xenon chloride (308 nm) excimer lasers are also used to treat a variety of dermatological conditions including psoriasis, vitiligo, atopic dermatitis, alopecia areata and leukoderma.

As light sources, excimer lasers are generally large in size, which is a disadvantage in their medical applications, although their sizes are rapidly decreasing with ongoing development.

Research is being conducted to compare differences in safety and effectiveness outcomes between conventional excimer laser refractive surgery and wavefront-guided or wavefront-optimized refractive surgery, as wavefront methods may better correct for higher-order aberrations.

=== Scientific research ===
Excimer lasers are also widely used in numerous fields of scientific research, both as primary sources and, particularly the XeCl laser, as pump sources for tunable dye lasers, mainly to excite laser dyes emitting in the blue-green region of the spectrum. These lasers are also commonly used in pulsed laser deposition systems, where their large fluence, short wavelength and non-continuous beam properties make them ideal for the ablation of a wide range of materials.

== See also ==
- Beam homogenizer
- Electrolaser
- Excimer lamp
- Moore's law
- Nitrogen laser
