= Excimer lamp =

Ultraviolet source based on spontaneous emission of excimer molecules

An excimer lamp (or excilamp) is a source of ultraviolet light based on spontaneous emission of excimer (exciplex) molecules.

== Introduction ==
Excimer lamps are quasimonochromatic light sources operating over a wide range of wavelengths in the ultraviolet (UV) and vacuum ultraviolet (VUV) spectral regions. Operation of an excimer lamp is based on the formation of excited dimers (excimers), which spontaneously transiting from the excited state to the ground state result in the emission of UV photons. The spectral maximum of excimer lamp radiation is specified by a working excimer molecule:

Wavelength and photon energy of excimer lamp radiation
| Excimer molecule | Wavelength (nm) | Photon energy (eV) |
|---|---|---|
| NeF* | 108 | 11.48 |
| Ar_{2}* | 126 | 9.84 |
| Kr_{2}* | 146 | 8.49 |
| F_{2}* | 158 | 7.85 |
| ArBr* | 165 | 7.52 |
| Xe_{2}* | 172 | 7.21 |
| ArCl* | 175 | 7.08 |
| KrI* | 190 | 6.49 |
| ArF* | 193 | 6.42 |
| KrBr* | 207 | 5.99 |
| KrCl* | 222 | 5.58 |
| KrF* | 248 | 5.01 |
| XeI* | 253 | 4.91 |
| Cl_{2}* | 259 | 4.79 |
| XeBr* | 282 | 4.41 |
| Br_{2}* | 289 | 4.29 |
| XeCl* | 308 | 4.03 |
| I_{2}* | 342 | 3.63 |
| XeF* | 351 | 3.53 |

Excimers are diatomic molecules (dimers) or polyatomic molecules that have stable excited electronic states and an unbound or weakly bound (thermally unstable) ground state. Initially, only homonuclear diatomic molecules with a stable excited state but a repulsive ground state were called excimers (excited dimers). The term "excimer" was later extended to refer any polyatomic molecule with a repulsive or weakly bound ground state. One can also come across the term "exciplex" (from "excited complex"). It is also an excimer molecule but not a homonuclear dimer. For instance, Xe_{2}*, Kr_{2}*, Ar_{2}* are excimer molecules, while XeCl*, KrCl*, XeBr*, ArCl*, Xe_{2}Cl* are referred to exciplex molecules. Dimers of rare gases and rare-gas–halogen dimers are the most spread and studied excimers. Rare-gas–halide trimers, metal excimers, metal–rare-gas excimers, metal–halide excimers, and rare-gas–oxide excimers are also known, but they are rarely used.

An excimer molecule can exist in an excited electronic state for a limited time, as a rule from a few to a few tens of nanoseconds. After that, an excimer molecule transits to the ground electronic state, while releasing the energy of internal electronic excitation in the form of a photon. Owing to a specific electronic structure of an excimer molecule, the energy gap between the lowest bound excited electronic state and the ground state amounts from 3.5 to 10 eV, depending on a kind of an excimer molecule and provides light emission in the UV and VUV spectral region. A typical spectral characteristic of excimer lamp radiation consists mainly of one intense narrow emission band. About 70–80% of the whole radiation power of an excimer lamp is concentrated in this emission band. The full width at half maximum of the emission band depends on a kind of an excimer molecule and excitation conditions and ranges within 2 to 15 nm. In fact, excimer lamps are sources of quasimonochromatic light. Therefore, such sources are suitable for spectral-selective irradiation and can even replace lasers in some cases.

== UV production ==
Radiation is produced owing to the spontaneous transition of an excimer molecule from an excited electronic state to the ground state. Excimer and exciplex molecules are not long-living formations. They rapidly decompose, typically within a few nanoseconds, releasing their excitation energy in the form of a UV photon:

emission by an excimer molecule:

$$\text{Rg}_2^*\ \xrightarrow[]{\tau}\ \text{Rg} + \text{Rg} + h\nu\ \text{(UV photon)},$$

emission by an exciplex molecule:

$$\text{RgX}^*\ \xrightarrow[]{\tau}\ \text{Rg} + \text{X} + h\nu\ \text{(UV photon)},$$

where Rg_{2}* is an excimer molecule, RgX* is an exciplex molecule, Rg is an atom of rare gas, and X is an atom of halogen.

== Excimer molecule formation ==
It is convenient to generate excimer molecules in a plasma. Electrons play an important role in a plasma and, in particular, in the formation of excimer molecules. To efficiently generate excimer molecules, the working medium (plasma) should contain sufficient concentration of electrons with energies that are high enough to produce the precursors of the excimer molecules, which are mainly excited and ionized rare gas atoms. Introduction of power into a gaseous mixture results in the formation of excited and ionized rare gas atoms as follows:

Electron excitation

Rg + e^{−} → Rg* + e^{−},

Direct electron ionization

Rg + e^{−} → Rg^{+} + 2e^{−},

Stepwise ionization

Rg* + e^{−} → Rg^{+} + 2e^{−},

where Rg* is a rare gas atom in an excited electronic state, Rg^{+} is a rare gas ion, and e^{−} is an electron.

When there are enough excited rare gas atoms accumulated in a plasma, the excimer molecules are formed by the following reaction:

Rg* + Rg + M → Rg_{2}* + M,

where Rg_{2}* is an excimer molecule, and M is a third particle carrying away the excess energy to stabilize an excimer molecule. As a rule, it is a rare gas atom of the working medium.

Analyzing this three-body reaction, one can see that the efficiency of the production of excimer molecules is proportional to the concentration of excited rare gas atoms and the square of the concentration of rare gas atoms in the ground state. From this point of view, the concentration of rare gas in the working medium should be as high as possible. A higher concentration of rare gas is achieved by increasing gas pressure. However, an increase in the concentration of rare gas also intensifies the collisional quenching of excimer molecules, resulting in their radiationless decay:

Rg_{2}* + Rg → Rg* + 2Rg.

The collisional quenching of excimer molecules is negligible while the mean time between collisions is much higher than the lifetime of an excimer molecule in an excited electronic state. In practice, the optimal pressure of a working medium is found experimentally, and it amounts to approximately one atmosphere.

A mechanism underlying the formation of exciplex molecules (rare gas halides) is a bit more complicated than the mechanism of excimer molecule formation. The formation of exciplex molecules occurs in two main ways. The first way is due to a reaction of ion-ion recombination, i.e., recombination of a positive rare gas ion and a negative halogen ion:

Rg^{+} + X^{−} + M → RgX* + M,

where RgX* is an exciplex molecule, and M is a collisional third partner, which is usually an atom or molecule of a gaseous mixture or buffer gas. The third particle takes the excess energy and stabilizes an exciplex molecule.

The formation of a negative halogen ion results from the interaction of a low-energy electron with a halogen molecule in a so-called process of the dissociative electron attachment:

X_{2} + e^{−} → X + X^{−},

where X is a halogen atom.

The pressure of a gaseous mixture is of great importance for efficient production of exciplex molecules due to the reaction of ion-ion recombination. The process of ion-ion recombination is dependent on three-body collisions, and the probability of such a collision increases with pressure. At low pressures of a gaseous mixture (several tens of torr), the reaction of ion-ion recombination is of little efficiency, while it is quite productive at pressures above 100 Torr.

The second way of the formation of exciplex molecules is a harpoon reaction. In this case, a halogen molecule or halogen-containing compound captures a weakly bound electron of an excited rare gas atom, and an exciplex molecule in an excited electronic state is formed:

Rg* + X_{2} → RgX* + X.

Since the harpoon reaction is a process of a two-body collision, it can proceed productively at a pressure significantly lower than that required for a three-body reaction. Thus, the harpoon reaction makes possible the efficient operation of an excimer lamp at low pressures of a gaseous mixture. The collisional quenching of exciplex molecules at low pressures of a gaseous mixture is much lower than at pressures required for productive proceeding the reaction of ion-ion recombination. Due to this, a low-pressure excimer lamp ensures the maximum efficiency in converting the pumping energy to UV radiation.

It should be mentioned that both the harpoon reaction and reaction of ion-ion recombination proceed simultaneously. The dominance of the first or second reaction is mainly determined by the pressure of a gaseous mixture. The harpoon reaction predominates at low pressures (below 50 Torr), while the reaction of ion-ion recombination prevails at higher pressures (above 100 Torr).

The kinetics of reactions proceeding in a plasma is diverse and is not limited to the processes considered above. The efficiency of producing exciplex molecules depends on the composition of a gaseous mixture and conditions of its excitation. The type of halogen donor plays an important role. The most effective and widely used halogen-carriers are homonuclear diatomic halogen molecules. More complex halogen compounds such as hydrogen halides, metal halides, and interhalogens are also used as a halogen-carrier but to a lesser extent.

A noteworthy halogen-carrier is alkali halide. A feature of alkali halides is a similarity of their chemical bond with that of exciplex molecules in excited electronic states. Exciplex molecules in excited electronic states are characterized by the ionic bond as well as alkali halides in the ground state. It opens up alternative mechanisms for the formation of exciplex molecules, namely substitution reactions:

Rg* + AX → RgX* + A,
Rg^{+} + AX → RgX* + A^{+},

where AX is an alkali halide molecule, A is an alkali metal atom, and A^{+} is an alkali metal ion.

These mechanisms of the formation of exciplex molecules are fundamentally different from the reaction of ion-ion recombination and harpoon reaction. An exciplex molecule is formed simply by replacing an atom/ion of alkali metal from an alkali halide molecule by an excited atom/ion of rare gas.

An advantage of using alkali halides is that both the substitution reactions can simultaneously proceed at low pressures with comparable productivity. Moreover, both excited atoms and ions of rare gas are effectively used in the production of exciplex molecules in contrast to excimer lamps using other halogen-carriers. It is of importance because the ionization and excitation of rare gas consume most of the introduced energy. Since the reaction of ion-ion recombination and harpoon reaction dominate depending on the pressure of a gaseous mixture, the generation of rare gas ions is unprofitable at low pressures, while the excitation of rare gas is unreasonable at high pressures. A drawback of using alkali halides is high temperatures required for providing the necessary concentration of alkali halide molecules in a gaseous mixture. Despite this, the use of alkali halides as a halogen-carrier is especially promising in the development of exciplex lasers operating at low pressures.

== Methods of excitation ==
One of the widely used ways to excite emission of excimer molecules is an electric discharge. There are a lot of discharge types used for pumping excimer lamps. Some examples are glow discharge, pulsed discharge, capacitive discharge, longitudinal and transverse discharges, volume discharge, spark discharge, and microhollow discharge. As of 2013, dielectric barrier discharge (DBD), a type of capacitive discharge, is the most common type used in commercial lamps. A benefit of the DBD excimer lamps is that the electrodes are not in direct contact with the active medium (plasma). Absence of interaction between the electrodes and the discharge eliminates electrode corrosion as well as contamination of the active medium by sputtered electrode material, which considerably increases the lifetime of DBD excimer lamps in comparison with others. Moreover, a dielectric barrier discharge ensures effective excitation of a gas mixture in a wide range of working pressures from a few torrs to more than one atmosphere. Excimer lamps can be made in any desired shape of the radiating surface, satisfying requirements of a specific task.

== Benefits of excimer lamps ==
The main advantages of excimer lamps over other sources of UV and VUV radiation are as follows:

- high average specific power of UV radiation (up to 1 Watt per cubic centimeter of active medium);
- high energy of an emitted photon (from 3.5 to 11.5 eV);
- quasimonochromatic radiation with the spectral full-width at half maximum from 2 to 15 nm;
- high power spectral density of UV radiation;
- choice of the wavelength of the spectral maximum of UV radiation for specific purposes (see table);
- availability of multi-wave UV radiation owing to simultaneous excitation of several kinds of working excimer molecules;
- absence of visible and IR radiation;
- instant achievement of the operating mode;
- low heating of radiating surface;
- absence of mercury.

== Applications ==
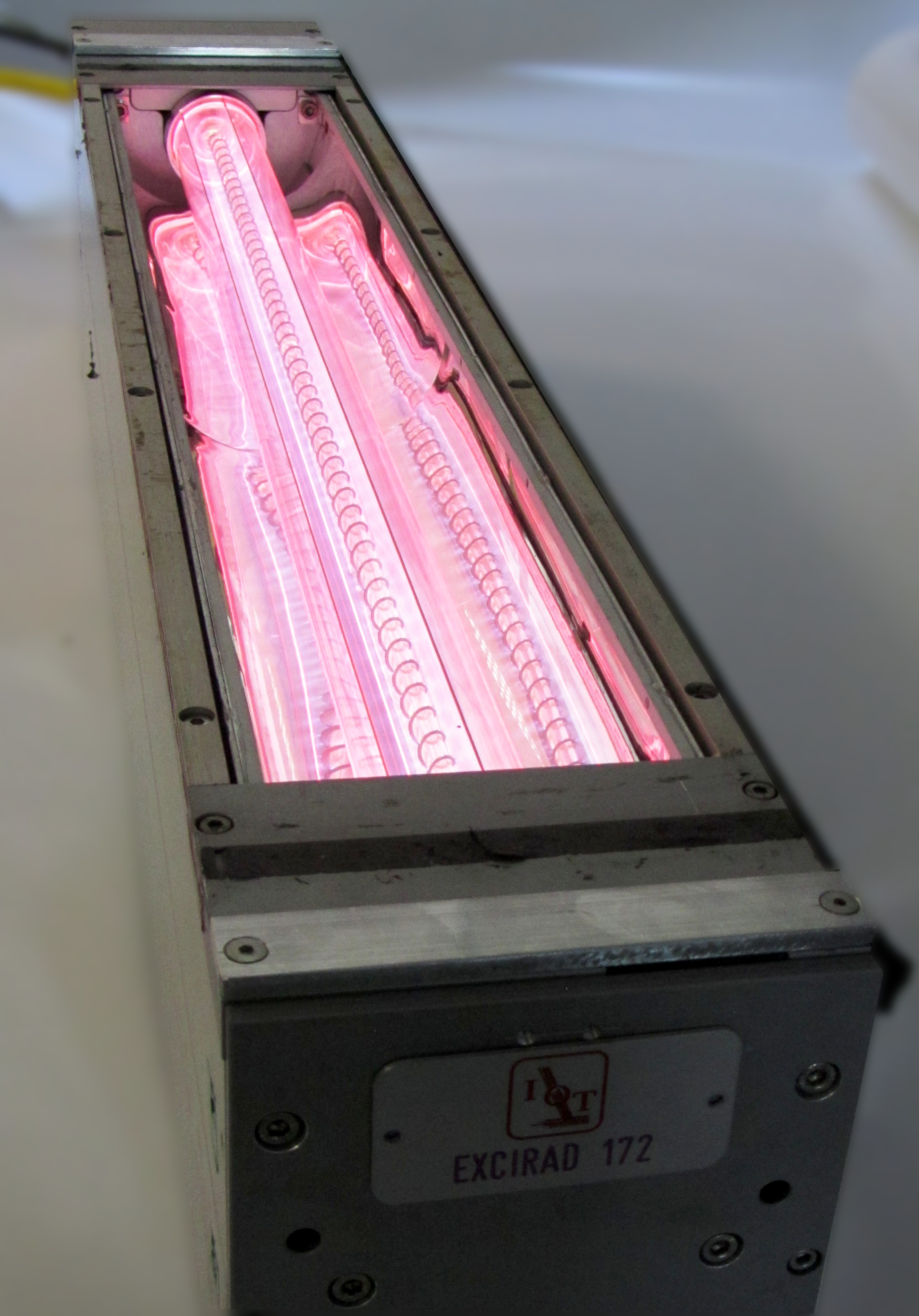
Commercially used 172 nm excimer lamp for printing industry

Light sources emitting in the UV spectral region are widely used in techniques involving photo-chemical processes, e.g., curing of inks, adhesives, varnishes and coatings, photolithography, UV induced growth of dielectrics, UV induced surface modification, and cleaning or material deposition. Incoherent sources of UV radiation have some advantages over laser sources because of their lower cost, a huge area of irradiation, and ease of use, especially when large-scale industrial processes are envisaged.

Mercury lamps (λ = 253.7 nm) are widely used UV sources, but their production, use, and disposal of old lamps pose a threat to human health and environmental pollution. Compared to those, excimer lamps have a number of advantages. A specific feature of an excimer molecule is the absence of a strong bond in the ground electronic state. Thanks to this, high-intensity UV radiation can be extracted from a plasma without significant self-absorption. This makes possible to convert efficiently energy deposited to the active medium into UV radiation.

Excimer lamps are referred to cold sources of UV radiation since the radiating surface of excimer lamps remains at relatively low temperatures in contrast with traditional UV lamps like a mercury one. Because the medium does not need to be heated, excimer lamps reach their peak output almost immediately after they are turned on.

Rare gas and rare gas-halide excimer lamps generally radiate in the ultraviolet (UV) and vacuum-ultraviolet (VUV) spectral regions (see table). Their unique narrow-band emission characteristics, high quantum efficiency, and high-energy photons make them suitable for applications such as absorption spectroscopy, UV curing, UV coating, disinfection, ozone generation, destruction of gaseous organic waste, photo-etching and photo-deposition and more other applications.

Light sources emitting photons in the energy range of 3.5–10 eV find applications in many fields due to the ability of high-energy photons to cleave most chemical bonds and kill microbes destroying nucleic acids and disrupting their DNA. Examples of excimer lamp applications include purification and disinfection of drinking water, pool water, air, sewage purification, decontamination of industrial waste, photochemical synthesis and degradation of organic compounds in flue gases and water, photopolymerization of organic coatings and paints, and photo-enhanced chemical vapor deposition. In all cases UV photons excite species or cleave chemical bonds, resulting in the formation of radicals or other chemical reagents, which initiate a required reaction.

An excimer lamp has selective action. UV radiation of a given wavelength can selectively excite species or generate required radicals. Such lamps can be useful for photophysical and photochemical processing such as UV curing of paints, varnishes, and adhesives, cleansing and modifying surface properties, polymerization of lacquers and paints, and photo-degradation of a variety of pollutants. Photo-etching of polymers is possible using different wavelengths: 172 nm by xenon excimer, 222 nm by krypton chloride, and 308 nm by xenon chloride. Excimer UV sources can be used for microstructuring large-area polymer surfaces. XeCl-excimer lamps (308 nm) are especially suitable to get tan.

Fluorescence spectroscopy is one of the most common methods for detecting biomolecules. Biomolecules can be labeled with fluoroprobe, which then is excited by a short pulse of UV light, leading to re-emission in the visible spectral region. Detecting this re-emitted light, one can judge the density of labeled molecules. Lanthanide complexes are commonly used as fluoroprobes. Due to their long lifetime, they play an important role in Förster resonance energy transfer (FRET) analysis.

At present, excimer lamps are coming into use in ecology, photochemistry, photobiology, medicine, criminalistics, petrochemistry, physics, microelectronics, different engineering tasks, wide-ranging technologies, science, various branches of industry including the food industry, and many others.

== Environmental contamination ==
Mercury-vapor lamps are the most common source of UV radiation due to their high efficiency. The toxicity of mercury in these lamps poses disposal and environmental problems. In comparison, excimer lamps based on rare gases are typically non-hazardous and excimer lamps containing halogen are more environmentally benign than mercury ones.
