= Xenon monochloride =

Ball-and-stick model of xenon monochloride
Spacefill model of xenon monochloride

Identifiers
| CAS Number | 55130-03-5 |
| 3D model (JSmol) | Interactive image |
| ChemSpider | 26944143 |
| PubChem CID | 21863288 |
| CompTox Dashboard (EPA) | DTXSID101030396 |
- InChI: InChI=1S/ClXe/c1-2 Key: HGCGQDMQKGRJNO-UHFFFAOYSA-N; InChI=1/ClXe/c1-2 Key: HGCGQDMQKGRJNO-UHFFFAOYAS
- SMILES: Cl[Xe]

Properties
| Chemical formula | XeCl |
| Molar mass | 166.746 g/mol |
- Except where otherwise noted, data are given for materials in their standard state (at 25 °C [77 °F], 100 kPa). Infobox references

Xenon monochloride (XeCl) is an exciplex which is used in excimer lasers and excimer lamps emitting near ultraviolet light at 308 nm. It is most commonly used in medicine. Xenon monochloride was first synthesized in the 1960s. Its kinetic scheme is very complex and its state changes occur on a nanosecond timescale. In the gaseous state, at least two kinds of xenon monochloride are known: XeCl and Xe_{2}Cl, whereas complex aggregates form in the solid state in noble gas matrices. The excited state of xenon resembles halogens and it reacts with them to form excited molecular compounds.

== Introduction ==
Molecules that are only stable in electronically excited states are called excimer molecules, but may be called exciplex molecules if they are heteronuclear. The exciplex halides constitute an important class of rare gas halides with formula RgX. Rg is the noble gas, and X is the halogen. These molecules are de-excited by emitting a photon whose energy is some Electronvolts. Therefore, the wavelength of the light produced is in the visible or ultraviolet spectra. Gas or gaseous mixtures that may lead to the formation of these molecules is a quasi-ideal laser medium since the population inversion is directly obtained when the excimer is formed. The other consequence of the unstable ground state is that the excimer or exciplex species must be generated by an external excitation (either through a discharge, an electron beam, microwave, or radiation). At least two gases must be used to generate exciplexes: a halogen donor and a rare gas. However, as shown in Table 1, not all rare gas halide molecules lead to the development of lasers; some may not even exist. Multiple molecules and applications have been developed.

Table 1. Properties of rare-gas halides. D – molecule is dissociative and does not exist. F – observed fluorescence. L – molecule with laser effect.
| Halogen/Rare gas | Helium | Neon | Argon | Krypton | Xenon |
|---|---|---|---|---|---|
| Fluorine | D | F & D | L | L | L |
| Chlorine | D | D | F & D | L | L |
| Bromine | D | D | D | F & D | L |
| Iodine | D | D | D | D | F & D |

Several review articles related to xenon chloride laser technology and its applications have been published.

Some authors stress the importance of accurately determining the kinetics of the laser medium when rare-gas halides are involved. Recent results have provided insight into the physical chemistry of the laser medium. Spectroscopic investigations are limited to the visible-near ultraviolet region where exciplex lasers operate. Only binary gas mixtures of xenon and a chlorine donor, or ternary mixtures that also include a buffer gas (a rare gas indicated by Rg) will be considered. The most interesting chlorine donors are CCl_{4} and HCl because of their use in laser technology, and Cl_{2} (see Figure 1).

XeCl and Xe_{2}Cl are most important in laser applications amongst the xenon chlorides. Although discharge lamps based on low-pressure mixtures of xenon and a chlorine donor emit incoherent light, they are reliable and easy to operate.

== History ==
The idea that the noble gases can form halides arose in the early 1920s: A. von Antropoff and Oddo suggested that krypton and xenon may form bromides and chlorides. In 1933, Yost and Kaye unsuccessfully tried to synthesize xenon chloride by illuminating a mixture of xenon (70 torr of pressure) and chlorine (225 torr) with a mercury-vapor lamp.

Xenon monochlorides were first synthesized in 1965. Later, solid XeCl_{2} and XeCl_{4} compounds were synthesized at low temperatures. In 1991, Prosperio et al. demonstrated the existence of XeCl_{2} in the gaseous state, which is important for lasing kinetics, although it emits an uninteresting infrared light.

In 1973 Riveros et al. synthesized XeCl^{−} ions in the gaseous phase at a pressure of 10^{−4} torr. This ionic molecule attracted little interest.

Systematic studies of XeCl were initiated in 1975 by Velazco and Setser, who demonstrated 304 nm emission from XeCl_{*}. This emission was obtained by mixing xenon atoms (Xe_{3}P_{2}) with chlorine gas Cl_{2} or other chlorinated compounds (NOCl and SOCl_{2}). The excitation was provided by a cold cathode discharge; the total pressure was a few torr. Months later, Ewing and Brau reported lasing from a XeCl film ^{2}Σ_{1/2}^{+} → ^{2}Σ_{1/2}^{+} at 308 nm, which was most promising for industrial applications. The preferred chlorine donor for XeCl laser is HCl. The reasons given are:

- Low absorption cross section at 308 nm of the order of 10^{−19} cm^{2}. The HCl concentration does not substantially affect the laser's output energy. This is not the case for Cl_{2} which has a very strong absorption at about 300 nm.
- Less toxic than chlorine.
- Generates a post-dissociation excimer laser, which is much better than other chlorine donors. 16,000 consecutive excimer lasers pulses were obtained without affecting energy output.
- The constant rate of vibrational excitation and dissociative electron attachment are more favorable for HCl than for other chlorine donors. These processes help the formation of XeCl_{*}.

Three years later Lorentz et al. performed experiments at high pressures (a few atmospheres) in a mixture containing (Ar/XeCl_{2}) and found an emission centered at 450 nm which was attributed to XeCl_{2}.

The first XeCl_{2} laser was developed in 1980. This type of laser is likely to be tunable over a wide range of wavelengths (30 nm) in the visible spectrum. This is true even if the absorption phenomena occur on the side of shorter wavelengths and therefore limits the laser action at the red region of the electromagnetic spectrum from light emission. Solid state experiments with Xe_{2}Cl_{*} suggest that the gaseous state is more suitable for the development of this type of laser. The measured amplification was correct in the solid state. The liquid state seems like an ideal dye laser although implementation seems complex and costly. Presently, the Xe_{2}Cl laser has not been industrially developed. Unlike XeCl, the best chlorine donor is CCl_{4} while no laser action occurs when using HCl.

Four molecules are a priori synthesized in the mixtures. Note particularly the possibility of synthesizing these under the experimental conditions of lasers and their roles.

XeHCl was observed in a gaseous medium. However, this molecule has only been detected via emission spectra in the microwave, radio and far infrared regions, but with emission predicted by two theoretical studies at 232 nm and 129 nm. Note, however, that when nearly in aggregate, it is more likely to be stable at the solid state. It is the same for Xe_{3}Cl which can theoretically emit at 500 nm, while this activity has never been observed in the gaseous state.

XeH has three known emission lines. They were observed at 190 nm, 250 nm and 660 nm. However, they have never manifested in the laser spectra, which leads to the assumption that XeH is not formed under the experimental conditions. Conversely, the XeH^{+} ion is formed in the mixtures used in lasers. It plays a significant role in kinetics in the synthesis of XeCl_{*}, through a reaction that competes with the creation of Xe^{+} ions (shown below):

HCl^{+} + Xe → Xe^{+} + HCl (80 ± 10%)

HCl^{+} + Xe → XeH^{+} + HCl (20 ± 10%)

The rate constant of the entire process is 6.4×10^{−10} cm^{3}s^{−1} (± 20%).

Xe^{+} ion is a pivotal precursor in the formation of the exciplex molecule.

== XeCl exciplex ==
=== The structure of the XeCl molecule ===
The potential curves presented in Figure 2 are the results of theoretical and experimental works.

Common characteristics for all halide states of the noble gases includes a group of related excited states B, C and D and a lower group of dissociatively or weakly bound states A and X. States B, D and X have Σ symmetry (Λ = 1/2) while the C state has π symmetry (Λ = 3/2). The state A is itself split into two sub-states, a symmetry Σ, A_{1/2} and the other symmetry π, A_{3/2}.

The ionization potential of noble gases in their lowest excited state is close to the electron affinity of halogen atoms. Thus, the rare gas halide molecules are formed by an ionic bond since the excited electron of the noble gas is partly transferred to the halogen atom. The molecule so formed is therefore stable as is the case of the states B, C and D.

This electron transfer does not occur with ground state atoms. As the rare gas atoms are not reactive. This is the case for states A and X.

==== The B, C and D states ====
These states are correlated with ground state Xe^{+} ions and Cl^{−}. The spin-orbital splitting of the Xe^{+} ion into two states (^{2}P_{3/2} and ^{2}P_{1/2}) is important; also the states B and D to which they are correlated are significantly far away. For the minimum potential curves corresponding to almost the same value of the internuclear distance (r_{e}#0.3 nm), the energy difference measured experimentally is about 9940 cm^{−1}. This is in agreement with the energy of separation of Xe^{+} (^{2}P_{3/2}) and Xe^{+} (^{2}P_{1/2}) states valued at 10574 cm^{−1}.

Potential curves of the states B and C intersect adiabatically with a potential curve correlated to Xe* + Cl at large internuclear distances: 7.1 nm experimentally and 7.19 nm and 6.3 nm theoretically. A more recent theoretical investigation specifies these intersection phenomena. States B and C merging at long-distance, intersect two successive potential curves correlated to Xe* + Cl. The lowest correlated to Xe (^{3}P_{2}) + Cl (^{2}P_{3/2}) is 7.25 nm and after that, the next correlated to Xe (^{3}P_{1}) + Cl (^{2}P_{3/2}) is intercepted at 18.68 nm. As this intersection occurs at a great distance, the ionic character of the binding of these states near the equilibrium internuclear distance r_{e} is virtually unaffected.

This situation is slightly different for state D that crosses these two potential curves at a much shorter distance. Indeed, state D intersects Xe (^{3}P_{2}) + Cl (^{2}P_{3/2}) only at 0.89 nm and Xe (^{3}P_{1}) + Cl (^{2}P_{3/2}) at 1.02 nm.

The distinction between states B and C is that they are correlated with Xe^{+} ions whose semi-occupied orbital p is in a plane parallel to the internuclear axis for the state B and perpendicular to this axis for the state C.

On an examination of the energy position of the potential curve of states B and C, their proximity results in some difficulty. the values of the energy gap (E_{B} – E_{C}) between the two states is enumerated in Table 2. The data is highly dispersed; computed values, in particular, are far removed from all experimental values. These were determined mostly from the intensity ratios of the two emissions XeCl_{*} centered at 308 nm and 345 nm, either with or without corrections by the participation of transition (B → A). The most direct measure is given by Jouvet et al. Excitation spectra of XeCl_{*} directly provide the energy difference between the vibrational levels v′=0 and v″=0 which correspond respectively to the B and C states. This value of 90 cm^{−1} is close to other measurements from studies in kinetics.

Table 2 Energy gap (E_{B} – E_{C}) between the states B and C of XeCl.
| E_{B} – E_{C} (cm^{−1}) | Process | Year | Reference |
|---|---|---|---|
| −1489 | C | 1977 | |
| −560 | C | 1978 | |
| 7 | I | 1979 | |
| 81 | I & C | 1979 | |
| 128 ± 35 | I | 1980 | |
| −5.4 ± 25 | I | 1980 | |
| 200 | I | 1980 | |
| 230 | I | 1980 | |
| 180 | C | 1981 | |
| 289 | I^{*} | 1982 | |
| 220 ± 40 | I | 1983 | |
| 85 | C | 1984 | |
| 0 | C | 1984 | |
| −22 | C | 1985 | |
| > 50 | I^{**} | 1986 | |
| 230 ± 40 | I | 1987 | |
| 90 ± 2 | Absorption | 1989 | |
| 98 ^{+30}_{−40} | I & C | 1990 | |
| 118 ± 40 | I | 1992 | |

I: measurement derived from the value of the intensity ratios of the XeCl emissions centered at 308 and 345 nm (see § 3-1-1)

C: measurement derived from a kinetic study providing the coupling constants between these two states.

^{*}: Emission at 345 nm is not corrected for the contribution XeCl (B → A)

^{**}: XeCl is in the solid state.

Positioning of state B in relation to state C is theoretically justified by considering the configuration interaction between the ionic and covalent character states of similar symmetry. In a state ^{2}Σ (as states B and X), a simply occupied orbital is located closer to an orbital of another atom such that the interaction or exchange of charges between two atoms are larger and easier than in a state ^{2}π (like states C and A_{3/2}), where a simply occupied orbital is perpendicular to the molecular axis and far away from another atom. The correction introduced by this phenomenon in terms of energy values is much more important for Σ states than for the π states. This interaction greatly increases the energy of state B relative to that of state C. Hence, the positioning on the observed potential curves from Figure 2.

==== The X and A states ====
The lowest states are correlated with ground state xenon and chlorine atoms.

Due to spin-orbital splitting of the chlorine atom level at 881 cm^{−1} into two states, (^{2}P_{3/2}) and (^{2}P_{1/2}), state A is divided into two sub-states. However, the effect of the spin-orbital coupling here is significantly weaker than in the case of Xe^{+} ion. At large internuclear distances, an energy gap of 882 cm^{−1} between A_{1/2} and A_{3/2} was experimentally measured in the solid state in a neon matrix. Thus, this value is very close to the energy separation of states Cl (^{2}P_{3/2}) and Cl (^{2}P_{1/2}). This confirms the theoretical assumptions of state correlations between XeCl state A and Cl. At large distances state A_{3/2} is similar to state X. Becker et al., who laid out the interaction potentials of ^{35}Cl (^{2}P_{3/2} and ^{2}P_{1/2}) and Xe (^{1}S_{0}) from the analysis of quasi–elastic scattering in collisions produced from crossed beams, has experimentally confirmed this result. Unlike some other noble gas halides, XeCl has a non-dissociative ground state. This bonding character was demonstrated experimentally well before theoretical studies of XeCl in solid state argon matrices at 20K and later in the gaseous state.

The Van der Waals force between atoms is not strong enough in state X to explain the presence of a potential well that when low (the depth is in the order of kilotorr) can contain between 12 and 20 vibrational levels (see Table 3). The relative increase in the binding energy of state X compared to state A can also be explained by taking into account the configuration interaction. State A is also very lightly bound with binding energy half that of state X.

Table 3 Experimental numbers of vibrational levels in the potential wells of state X.
| Value | Reference |
|---|---|
| 15 | |
| 20 | |
| 12 | |
| 18 ± 1 | |

==== Spectroscopic constants ====
The energy E^{v'j'}_{M} of a known state M with a vibrational level v' with the rotational quantum number j is:

E^{v'j'}_{M} = T_{e}(M) + E_{Vib}(M) + E_{Rot}(M) where T_{e}(M), E_{Vib}(M) and E_{Rot}(M) respectively denote the molecule's vibrational and rotational electronic energies.

===== Electronic structure =====
The main features of the electronic states of a known state M are usually the dissociation energy D_{e}, the inter-atomic distance r_{e} and energy of the bottom of the potential well E_{M}. For XeCl, different reported values of these quantities are summarized in Tables 4, 5 and 6. They were determined theoretically or experimentally for isotope ^{35}Cl in the solid or gaseous state.

Table 4. Dissociation energies D_{e} in cm^{−1}.
| Ref | X | A | B | C | D |
|---|---|---|---|---|---|
| | 280 ± 7% | 129 ± 7% | | | |
| | | | 33,957 | 33,392 | 33,634 |
| | | | | 36,699 | |
| | 281 ± 10 | | 36,553 | | 37,148 |
| | 255 ± 10 | | 36,540 | | |
| | 281.1 ± 0.7 | | | | |
| | | 154 | | | |
| | | 161 | | | |
| | 225 | | | | |
| | | | 35,459 | | |

====== Dissociation energies ======
Dissociation energies have been calculated or measured for different states of the excimer. Some states have more measurements than others. States A, C and D have too few measurements for a statistical analysis. For state B, the four values are not consistent with each other

For state X, there are six values, two of which are outliers. That of Flannery is an old, imprecise theoretical estimate. That of Tellinghuisen et al. is the first experimental determination made in 1976. Seven years later the same team corrected this value and closed the gap on the most recent estimates. The remaining four values seem to be the only reliable ones. D_{e} is (with a probability of 95%) between 278.3 cm^{−1} and 285.3 cm^{−1}. The interval corresponds to a 1.3% fluctuation around 281.5 cm^{-1}. Indeed, among the selected determinations are two measures with high uncertainty, and a third which the author does not indicate. The value of D_{e} of state X, depends on the number of vibrational levels contained in the well and sets the number of transitions bound → bound that can be achieved. This result is fundamental to a better understanding of XeCl laser spectroscopy.

====== Equilibrium atomic distances ======
Table 5: Equilibrium Inter-atomic Distances r_{e} in Ǻ.
| Ref | X | A | B | C | D |
|---|---|---|---|---|---|
| | 3.44 | | | | |
| | 3.23 | 4.1 | | | |
| | | | 3.22 | 3.14 | 3.18 |
| | | | 3.227 | | |
| | | | | 3.14 | |
| | 3.23 | | 3.007 | | 2.922 |
| | 3.18 | | 2.9374 | | |
| | | | | 3.074 | |
| | | 4.05 | | | |
| | 3.23 | 4.09 | | | |
| | | | 2.9 | | |
| | | | 3.17 | 3.08 | 3.12 |

The interatomic distance for states A, C and D has few measurements, but they are close. On average, state A is 0.408 nm, state D, 0.307 nm and state C, 0.311 nm.

For the state X, the theoretical determination of Adrian and Jette is statistically far from the others. Omitting it, using confidence level of 95% state X r_{e}, will be in the range: 0.318 nm < r _{e} < 0.326 nm.

The value of Tellinghuisen et al. is at the limit of the interval. If ignored, the other three authors announce an identical value of 0.323 nm.

Tellinghuisen's value for state B is far from others for r_{e}. It is the same for Ewing et Brau, the oldest study of the noble gas halides which is based on the analogy of the excited rare gas with alkali metals. These are only estimates. These two values will be discarded to give a confidence interval at 95% for the interatomic distance of state B: 0.2993 nm < r_{e} < 0.3319 nm.

====== Bottom of the potential well energies ======
Table 6: Bottom of the potential well energies E_{i} in cm^{−1}.
| Ref | X | A | B | C | D |
|---|---|---|---|---|---|
| | | | 34,441 | 35,005 | 45,329 |
| | | | 32,398 ± 1 | 32,303 ± 1 | |
| | | | | 29570 | |
| | 0 | | 32405.8 | | |
| | | | | 32,828 | |
| | 22.7 | 29.4 | | | |
| | | | 32,382 | | |
| | | | 30,860 | | |
| | | | 32,405 | | |

Table 6 shows that there is very little information for states X, A and D. For state X, Sur et al. arbitrarily took bottom of the well X as the origin of their energy scale. It is therefore not a direct measurement. Therefore, the state X as well as state A have been the subject of only one study; that of Aquilanti et al.. For state D, two quite different determinations exist.

As was seen in an earlier section, the location of states B and C is problematic.

State B has the most attention from researchers. Two measures are statistically far from the others. Besides the previously mentioned study by Ewing and Brau, the old theoretical work of Hay and Dunning are among the doubtful determinations which will be broached soon. Without considering these values, the experimental work provides a confidence interval at a very narrow 95% threshold: from 32380.1 cm^{−1} to 32415.3 cm^{−1}.

In contrast, no conclusion can be drawn statistically given the small number of measurements of state C. However, further analysis will illuminate despite the non-matching character values in Table 6. Indeed, the positioning of the C states with respect to state B has resulted in many publications.

A statistical analysis of the values of Table 2 provides a step by step approach to the confidence interval at 95% which is the following: 76.8 cm^{−1} < (E_{B} - E_{C}) < 100.2 cm^{−1}. Only four measures belong to this interval. This is the direct determination of Jouvet et al. and three values deduced from kinetic studies. On the other hand, a point estimate gives 88.5 cm^{−1} and the only measure to be consistent with it (given the absolute error indicated) is from Jouvet et al.. at (90 ± 2 cm^{−1}). Statistical study then confirms the conclusions reached in paragraph 1.1.

The confidence intervals listed above for state B and the energy difference (E_{B} – E_{C}) produce an interval for E_{C}: 32279.9 cm^{−1} < E_{C} < 32338.4 cm^{−1}.

Under these conditions, only the value of Jouvet et al. in Table 6 is consistent with this range. The three doubtful determinations include that of Hay and Dunning with a defective value for E_{B}. Another early theoretical study by Clugston and Gordon also resulted in this interval. The same is true for solid state experimental work carried out by Fajardo and Apkarian.

Calculating the mean of the two values in Table 6 yields 43838.45 cm^{-1}. The energy gap of state B is then of the order of 11400 cm^{−1}. Shostak and Strong experimentally determined the energy difference between states A and B. They found 9900 cm^{−1}. The difference between these values (E_{B} – E_{D}) is very sharp. Considering only work by Sur et al., the energy difference between states B and D becomes of the order of 9950 cm^{−1} which is close to that of Shostak and Strong. This observation casts fresh doubts on the theoretical work of Hay and Dunning for which (E_{B} – E_{D}) is 10888 cm^{−1}.

With respect to the electronic structure, it appears that older studies pose a problem regarding some of their results. On the other hand, work carried out by Fajardo and Apkarian is not always consistent with observations of the gaseous state. Moreover, recent theoretical studies do not eliminate significant differences with experimental results.

The removal of the values of Hay and Dunning, reduces to a determination the values of D_{e} for states C and D, and makes the three other values relating to state B homogenous. Among these Tellinghuisen et al. poses a problem for other values. The energy D_{e} for state B then has an average value of 36184 cm^{−1}.

===== Vibrational Structure =====
The vibrational energy of level v’ of any state M can be calculated as:

E_{Vib}(M) = ω_{e} (v’+1/2) – ω_{e}x_{e} (v’+1/2)^{2}

where ω_{e} and (ω_{e}x_{e}) indicates respectively, the basic vibrational frequency and the anharmonicity constant. Their respective determinations are collected in Tables 7 and table 8.

====== The basic vibrational frequencies ======
The values of ω_{e} are grouped together in Table 7.

Table 7: Values of ω_{e} in cm^{−1}.
| Ref | X | B | C | D |
|---|---|---|---|---|
| | | 210 | | |
| | | 188 | 188 | 189 |
| | 27 ± 1 | 193 ± 1 | 204 ± 1 | |
| | | 194.235 | | |
| | 26.22 | 194.75 | | 204.34 |
| | 26.27 (± 0.55) | 195.17 (± 0.31) | | |
| | | 195.6 | | |
| | 50 ± 10 | | | |
| | | | 188 | |
| | | 195.2 | | |
| | | | 187 | |
| | | | | 210 |
| | | 195 | | 198 |
| | | 205 ± 12 | | |

States X, C and D have only four determinations. No measure can be considered statistically distant from others, despite disparities.

State B offers nine determinations. A statistical analysis leads to a confidence interval of 95%: 194.7 cm^{−1} < ω_{e} < 195.4 cm^{−1}.

Six values in Table 7 are strange. Three of them markedly so. They are old publications of which two (Hay and Dunning and Brau and Ewing) were central to the previous section. Golde's results were based on the same method as that used by Brau and Ewing.

The other three measures that are outside the range are more recent. Kvaran et al. researched the solid state. Like Fajardo and Apkarian, they observed significant differences in the gaseous state. In contrast, most surprising are disagreements between Jouvet et al. and Tamagake et al. which were studies with good results. Finally, among the values that agreed with these ranges are many studies that were more theoretical than experimental.

In conclusion, Tellinghuisen et al. gives very good results on both state B and state X.

The reported results on state C are rather questionable. The work by Jouvet et al. is at the extreme compared to other State B measures.

As for state D, excluding results by Hay and Dunning makes it more cohesive than the other three values.

Finally it is necessary to specify the values of ω_{e} for states X, C and D. The main interest of this clarification would be a better resolution of the vibrational structure of the transition used in the laser, which requires a better knowledge of state X. On the other hand, the structure of state C is important because it plays a fundamental role in laser kinetics .

====== Anharmonicity constants ======
Table 8 shows anharmonicity constant measurements for the various states. The measurements for constants of anharmonicity for states X, C and D are very inconsistent.

Table 8: Values of ω_{e}x_{e} in cm^{−1}.
| Ref | X | B | C | D |
|---|---|---|---|---|
| | | 0.66 | 0.85 | 0.80 |
| | | 0.25 ± 0.07 | 0.75 ± 0.1 | |
| | | 0.63152 | | |
| | – 0.321 | 0.627 | | 0.682 |
| | – 0.278 (± 0.17) | 0.543 (± 0.063) | | |
| | | 0.54 | | |

Six measurements for state B produce the confidence interval at 95%:

0.532 cm^{−1} < ω_{e}x_{e} < 0.669 cm^{−1}.

The work by Jouvet et al. is statistically far from the others and the authors cannot explain this difference. Hay and Dunning give correct forecasts, as does the vibrational structure study by Tellinghuisen et al..

===== Rotational structure =====
The following expression denotes rotational energy: E_{rot}(M) = B’.K’_{ef} – D’.(K’_{ef})^{2}, where K’_{ef} = j’(j’+1) ± (1/2).δ(j’+1/2) ;

B’ and D’ respectively are the rotational constant and the first centrifugal distortion constant. Their values are indicated in table 9 and table 10. δ is a parameter that is equal to 2.0 for state B and 0.4 for state X.

Table 9: Values of B’ in cm^{−1}.
| Ref | X (v'=0) | X (v'=12) | B |
|---|---|---|---|
| | 0.0585 | | 0.0675 |
| | 0.0560 | 0.0274 | |
| | | | 0.0669 |

Therefore, the rotational structures is very poorly known. Despite that, one should notice the consistency of some measurements made on B’.

Table 10: Values of D’ in cm^{−1}.
| Ref | X (v'=0) | X (v'=12) | B |
|---|---|---|---|
| | 9.3 × 10^{−7} | 1.9 × 10^{−6} | |
| | | | 3.2 × 10^{−8} |

=== Synthetic pathways ===
When they are in a configuration belonging to metastable states np^{5}(n+1)s^{1}, (n = 5 for xenon), rare gases possess properties of polarizability and elastic scattering similar to those of alkali metals. The valence electron, s, of the excited rare gas has a bond energy close to that of the alkali metal that follows it in the periodic table. In older publications, this analogy that is applicable only for the heavier rare gases, is used to study the behavior of these gases with halogen donors. The alkali metals have good chemical affinity for halogens and should have affinity for excited rare gases. Experimentally the collision cross section of metastable states of rare gases with the halogens is similar to that of alkali metals with halogens. Thus, an excited xenon has an electronic structure close to that of caesium, so that it can react with a chlorine donor in order to form XeCl_{*}.

Significant differences between alkali metals and excited rare gases exist in their molecular symmetry. The number of states of rare gas halides is greater than that of alkali metal salts. This is due to spin-orbital splitting of atoms and ions of rare gases.

The first condition to produce XeCl is to make xenon reactive. To do this, it must be either excited, ionized or both. Several methods of external excitation have been used. The most common are electric shocks, electron beams, laser excitation, microwaves and α particles.

The excitation is not selective and formation of XeCl_{*} may follow many paths. Their relative importance varies with the conditions, especially with pressure, mode of excitation and the halogen donor. When ternary mixtures are involved, the creation process of XeCl is more complicated. Nevertheless, the addition of a buffer gas offers many advantages. Other rare gases are cheaper than xenon, but they (along with their excited species and their ions) absorb less than xenon at 308 nm. Thus, the buffer gas can be used in very high proportions without much alteration of the laser's output power. Under these conditions, the proportions of xenon and HCl must match those required to produce the desired amount of exciplex molecule. The essential role of the buffer gas is to transfer to xenon atoms the necessary excitation energy. This transfer can be regarded as instantaneous. It can result in excitation or ionization of xenon or the formation of a RgXe^{+} ion. Each of these species may then react with the chlorine donor to form XeCl_{*}. On the other hand, the formation of neutral species of RgXe does not seem to be important.

The two main ways of exciplex synthesis are collision (between chlorine molecules and xenon, where at least one species is excited) and ion recombination. The buffer gas is sometimes a partner in the former and almost always involved in the latter.

The formation of XeCl_{*} is extremely effective since Konovalov et al. observed emission of XeCl in krypton while xenon was present only in trace amounts (0.2%).

==== Photoassociative pathway ====
XeCl_{*} synthesis occurs when a mixture containing xenon and chlorine (Cl_{2}) is excited by means of a laser emitting between 304 nm and 312 nm. Two reactions are then induced:

- excitation of an electronically isolated atom or molecule of xenon followed by reactive collisions
- simultaneous interaction of a pair in a collision and one or two laser-introduced photons generates an intermediate state that then results in the desired product without an intervening collision.

In the latter case, a transient complex is formed (Xe-Cl_{2})^{*} in the state (^{1}Π_{u}). Therefore, two dissociation pathways are possible from the time a photon is absorbed by the Cl-Cl pair or the pair Xe-Cl from (Xe-Cl_{2})^{*} in the state (^{1}Π_{u}).

Xe-Cl_{2}(^{1}Π_{u}) + hν → Xe-Cl_{2}(^{1}Π_{g}) → Xe^{+}Cl_{2}^{−} → XeCl(B,C) + Cl

Xe-Cl_{2}(^{1}Π_{u}) + hν → Xe-Cl(X)-Cl + hν → Xe-Cl(B)-Cl → XeCl(B) + Cl

The rate constant of the reaction was measured by considering the photon as a third partner. It is 6×10^{−29} cm^{6}s^{−1}.

Similar results were obtained with other chlorine donors including HCl and CCl_{4}.

In all cases, the molecules of XeCl(B, C) are always produced in states with a strong vibrational excitation.

==== Collision pathway ====
Numerous processes' importance rests on the type and excitation of the species in collision. The principal leftover in all cases is the emissions that follow from binary collisions.

===== Harpoon collisions =====
These reactions involve the chlorine donor at the ground state and an excited atom of xenon, both in the first 6s, Xe ^{*} and at higher levels Xe ^{**} such as level 6p.

====== Mechanism ======
Generally, these reactions can describe the result of collisions of the noble gas atoms (Rg) and halogen donors (RX), where X is a halogen atom and R a radical molecule. The products of the reactions depend strongly on the type of rare gas and halogen donor. In our case where Rg = Xe and X = Cl, the nature of the products follows this rule. In some cases, this collision may not provide any halide rare gas.

The atom Rg and the molecule RX follow when they approach the lowest adiabatic potential and the reaction proceeds by the orbital mechanism controlled at the crossover of the ionic-covalent. The reagents (Rg and RX) approach on a covalent diabatic surface. They then form a complex Rg_{*}...RX at a fairly large internuclear distance. Its potential is V(Rg, RX). When the distance becomes sufficiently small, it may be that V(Rg, RX) intersects an ionic potential surface (Rg^{+}...RX^{−}). The crossover can occur through the transfer of an electron from Rg to RX. This is known as a harpoon mechanism. In this case, the atoms continue on the new surface. This leads to a diffusion reaction and the formation of RgX^{*}.

Figure 3 shows the process of creating XeCl_{*} which involves Rg=Xe and X=Cl. After its transfer, the electron occupies an antibonding orbital of RCl. In the presence of Xe^{+}, RCl^{−} splits into R and Cl^{−}. Xe_{*} ions and Cl^{−} then recombine to form XeCl in states B, C and D because there is no new force between Cl^{−} and R. The vibrational excitation of XeCl_{*} is always important. In total, everything takes place according to the reaction equation:

Xe* + RCl → XeCl_{*}(B,C,D) + R with rate constant of k_{MX}

However, the competitive formation of XeCl_{*} reactions occur before or after the intersection. They correspond to the interactions of the V potential (Rg_{*}, RX^{*}) and V (Rg + RX ^{*}).

In general, this situation occurs when the ionic surface is intersected by covalent surfaces where RX is in its lowest excited state. The distribution of output depends on the number and nature of output channels that are possible following collisions. The most common occurs at the intersection of the potential surfaces by a transfer of electronic energy that can cause a dissociation of the excited acceptor:

Rg_{*} + RX → (Rg^{+}...RX^{−}) → Rg(B,C,D) + RX^{*} with rate constant k_{ET}

Rg_{*} + RX → (Rg^{+}...RX^{−}) → Rg + R + X with rate constant k_{D}

This pathway tends to become less important as the complexity of RX increases

It is also possible that the transfer took place in a state that is not correlated to the RX^{*} ion but at very high Rydberg states in the neutral molecule and lying just below the limits of ionization. Critical factors regulating the branching ratios are the potential energies interrelated with the molecular ion (V_{I}), the Rydberg group close to the ionization (V_{II}) or an initial excited atom (V_{III}). The importance of these pathways increases with the depth of hole V (Rg_{*}, RX^{*}).

When the highly separated asymptotic energy levels are in the order V_{I} > V_{II} > V_{III} and the potential energies (V_{II}) are attractive, the first failed intersection is encountered when the approach of reacting atoms favors output of (V_{II}) rather than the anionic (V_{I}). Since (V_{II}) has a cationic center that remains strongly linked, it preferentially leads to a transfer of excitation. This is the dissociative excitation reaction:

Rg_{*} + RX → Rg + R^{*} + X or Rg + R + X^{*} with rate constant k_{DE}

If V_{III} > V_{II} at long distance, the Penning ionization pathway or associative ionization are possible:

Penning ionization : Rg_{*} + RX → Rg + RX^{+} + e^{−} with rate constant k_{PI}

Associative ionization: Rg_{*} + RX → (RgRX)^{+} + e^{−} with rate constant k_{AI}

In (V_{I}) bonding with an halogen atom is in principle, weak and atomic transfer is enhanced between Rg and R. This potential thus leads to the formation of the exciplex.

There are therefore a priori five competitive ways of synthesizing RGX. For XeCl_{*} an excited xenon atom collides with a chlorine donor. These five reactions were all observed for various chlorine donors. To quantify the proportion of produced exciplex, it is customary to define the branching ratio. It shows the rate of formation of XeCl, as denoted by Γ _{XeCl}:

Γ_{XeCl} = k_{MX} / (k_{MX} + k_{AI} + k_{PI} + k_{ET} + k_{DE} + k_{D})

Γ_{XeCl} measurements were effectuated for several chlorine donors and principally for the 6s and 6p states of xenon.

Xe(6s or 6p) + RCl → products with rate constant k_{Q}

k_{Q} is the total rate constant and is calculated as: k_{Q} = k_{MX} + k_{AI} + k_{PI} + k_{ET} + k_{DE} + k_{D}

Table 11. Total rate constants in cm^{3}s^{−1} for harpoon collisions between Xe* and Cl_{2}. Γ_{XeCl} = 1.
| State of xenon | k_{Q} × 10^{−10} | Reference |
|---|---|---|
| ^{3}P_{2} or (6s[3/2]_{2}) | (10 ± 2) | |
| ^{3}P_{2} or (6s[3/2]_{2}) | 7.2 | |
| ^{3}P_{2} or (6s[3/2]_{2}) | (7.0 ± 0.5) | |
| ^{3}P_{1} | (7.9 ± 0.9) | |
| ^{1}P_{1} | (7.6 ± 0.7) | |
| (6p[1/2]_{0}) | (14.6 ± 0.2) | |
| (6p[1/2]_{0}) | (17.9 ± 0.2) | |
| (6p[1/2]_{2}) | (14.5 ± 0.2) | |
| (6p[1/2]_{2}) | (15.5 ± 0.2) | |
| (6p[5/2]_{2}) | (13.3 ± 1.0) | |
| (6p[5/2]_{2}) | (12.8 ± 0.3) | |
| (6p'[3/2]_{2}) | (18.6 ± 0.5) | |
| (6p'[1/2]_{0}) | (21.9 ± 1.0) | |
| (7p[5/2]_{2}) | (30.7 ± 1.9) | |
| (7p[1/2]_{0}) | (29.5 ± 0.8) | |
| (7d[1/2]_{1}) | (9.2 ± 0.5) | |

The results for Cl_{2}, CCl_{4} and HCl (v = 0) are summarized in Tables 11–13. Γ_{XeCl} is set equal to 1 by Setser Ku where the chlorine donor is Cl_{2}. This decision is justified by the fact that for Xe* + Cl_{2} we have V_{II} > V_{I} > V_{III}, which according to Simons fixes an unlikely channel for the excitation transfer.

Table 12 : Total rate constants in cm^{3}s^{−1} and Γ_{XeCl} for the harpoon collisions between Xe* and HCl (v = 0).
| State of xenon | k_{Q} × 10^{−10} | Γ_{XeCl} | Reference |
|---|---|---|---|
| ^{3}P_{1} or (6s[3/2]_{1}) | 6.2 | 0.01 | |
| ^{3}P_{2} or (6s[3/2]_{2}) | (7 ± 2) | | |
| ^{3}P_{2} or (6s[3/2]_{2}) | 5.6 | 0.01 | and Velazco et al. |
| ^{3}P_{2} or (6s[3/2]_{2}) | 5.6 | <0.02 | |
| ^{1}P_{1} | 4.62 | | Chen and Setser |
| ^{1}P_{1} | 7 | ≈0 | |
| (6p[1/2]_{0}) | (8.3 ± 0.5) | 0.80 ± 0.15 | |
| (6p[3/2]_{2}) | (8.0 ± 0.5) | 0.60 ± 0.15 | |
| (6p[3/2]_{2}) | (6.5 ± 0.2) | | |
| (6p[5/2]_{2}) | (8.0 ± 0.5) | 0.40 ± 0.15 | |
| 5d[3/2] | (15.6 ± 1.5) | 0.48 | |
| Summary of 6p states | 5 | | |
| Summary of 6p states | 5.6 | 0.60 | |

A first analysis of Tables 11-13 shows that the results are in good agreement when several measurements were made for the same reaction. We find that most collisions had their rate constants measured only once. Moreover, with rare exceptions, these determinations for K_{Q} and Γ_{XeCl} are limited to the lowest excited states of atomic xenon. This shows the need for new measures to confirm the available experimental results and estimate the role of other states that do not fail to form if one makes use of, as for the lasers, non-selective modes of excitation.

Table 13 : Total rate constants in cm^{3}s^{−1} and Γ_{XeCl} for harpoon collisions between Xe* and CCl_{4}.
| State of xenon | k_{Q} × 10^{−10} | Γ_{XeCl} | Reference |
|---|---|---|---|
| ^{3}P_{1} and ^{3}P_{2} | 1.73 | 0.24 | |
| ^{3}P_{1} and ^{3}P_{2} | 6.3 | 0.13 | |
| (6p[1/2]_{0}) | (7.5 ± 0.2) | 0.68 ± 0.2 | |
| (6p[3/2]_{2}) | (7.8 ± 0.5) | 0 60 ± 0.15 | |
| (6p[5/2]_{2}) | (7.3 ± 0.5) | 0.35 ± 0.10 | |

An important result for XeCl lasers is evident in an initial analysis. Xe(6s) + HCl (v = 0) does not produce XeCl. However, according to the estimates of Kannari et al. 5% of exciplex synthesis occurs through the harpoon reaction. In addition, Xe(6p) states produce 2.5% of this amount.

====== Initial States: Xe(6s) ======
Molecular chlorine reacts efficiently with these xenon states. Since Cl_{2} is formed in gaseous mixtures (Figure 1), this reaction is important in the kinetics of XeCl lasers.

Reaction with CCl_{4} is faster than Cl_{2} by an order of magnitude, but it is still effective. This reaction is important in the kinetics of Xe_{2} lasers.

If the chlorine donor is HCl, the situation is more complex. Two situations are apparent:

- HCl at the ground state with vibrational level v=0. The values for K_{D} are very similar regardless of the initial state of xenon; the branching ratio for the 6s states is very low. The contribution of these xenon states to the formation of XeCl_{*} is negligible. In addition, competitive reactions occur before the intersection of the potential curves V(Xe* + HCl) and V(Xe^{+} + HCl^{−}). The quenching Xe (6s) HCl is important in laser kinetics. It destroys xenon states capable of forming an exciplex.
- HCl in the ground state with vibrational level v=1. For the Xe(^{3}P_{2}) state, Chang identified a marked increase in the XeCl production rate. The rate constant for XeCl synthesis was measured with a minimum value of 2×10^{−10} cm^{3}s^{−1} and Γ_{XeCl} = 35%. The first estimate made by Levin et al. and based on correspondence was published at 6×10^{−11} cm^{3}s^{−1} and Γ_{XeCl} = 11%, but this reaction was obsoleted by Chang's direct measurements. As the vibrational excitation of HCl increases, the rate of formation of XeCl follows. No direct measure is available, but analogical estimates exist. For v=2, values for synthesis rate constants include: 5.6×10^{−10} cm^{3}s^{−1} and 2.0×10^{−10} cm^{3}s^{−1}.

According to other authors, the set of vibrational levels are taken into account. And for V ≥ 1, Kannari et al. proposed a synthesis rate constant of 5.6×10^{−10} cm^{3}s^{−1} and Γ_{XeCl} = 26%. Experiments are necessary to clarify this aspect of laser kinetics.

====== Initial States: Xe(6p) ======
The synthetic reactions of XeCl are generally more effective than the 6s state. This applies for the three chlorine donors indicated graphically in tables 11, 12, and 13.

The rate constants are twice faster for chlorine than for HCl and CCl_{4}.

For HCl, the situation is different from the previous case. If the total rate constants are of the same order of magnitude as those of the 6s states, the branching ratios Γ_{XeCl} are high. The result explains the forecast by Kannari et al. regarding the effectiveness of the rate of synthesis of XeCl_{*} from Xe(6p).

With reference to the potential curves of Figure 3, the potential curves of V(Xe** + RX) and V(Xe^{+} + RX^{−}) intersect at a greater internuclear distance than 6s states in a region of strong interactions. This explains why the production of XeCl is more effective after the intersection than in the 6s states irrespective of the chlorine donor, as seen for Cl_{2}, HCl, CCl_{4}, and also for chlorofluorocarbons in the states 6p[1/2]_{0} and 6p[3/2]_{2}.

Competitive reactions occur. One of them has been experimentally observed and quantified – the collisional relaxation induced by HCl:

Xe(6p[3/2]_{2}) + HCl → Xe(6s[5/2]_{2}^{0}) + HCl with rate constant k_{a} or k_{a} = 4.3×10^{−11} cm^{3}s^{−1}.

This represents only 6% of the value of k_{Q} from table 12 for the (6p[3/2]_{2}) state. As the proportions of exciplex synthesis is placed at 60%, one should conclude that there are other important competitive processes at play.

The summarized results in Table 12 relate to HCl (v=0). For 6p states, the role of vibrational excitation of HCl in the kinetics of XeCl formation is poorly understood. Some authors argue for rate constants neighboring state v=0 if HCl is vibrationally excited, but this results are based on analogies. An experimental clarification is therefore needed. The rate constant for v=1 is placed at 5.6×10^{−10} cm^{3}s^{−1}. The same value is used for v=2. Kannari et al. is still not likely to reduce the different vibrational levels of HCl and for v≥1, 8.2×10^{−10} cm^{3}s^{−1} is proposed.

====== Strongly excited states of xenon ======
Experiments conducted with Cl_{2} show that the effectiveness of XeCl formation increases with the excitation energy of the xenon atom; the rate constant of synthesis is multiplied by three when one goes beyond the 6s states to the 7p states (table 11).

The rate of XeCl_{*} synthesis increases by an order of magnitude when one goes beyond the 6s states to the 6p states when CCl_{4} (table 13) is utilized.

HCL is ambiguous. An examination of Table 12 shows that the increase in k_{Q} does not appear to increase significantly with the xenon excitation. So far, no measurements go beyond the 5d[3/2] state that is roughly of the same energy as the 6p state. The rate of synthesis also seems very effective from the 7s[3/2] states without there being any known numerical value. The available information does not support assuming a more efficient rate of synthesis of the exciplex as the excitation of xenon gradually increases. Indeed, for the state 5d[5/2]_{3}^{0}, there is only an excitation with a reaction rate constant of 3.2×10^{−12} cm^{3}s^{−1}:

Xe(5d[5/2]_{2}^{0}) + HCl → Xe(6p[3/2]_{2}) + HCl

Also, the Rydberg states do not appear to have produced XeCl. The observed reactions for Xe(31f) are the following:

Xe(31f) + HCl(J) → Xe(31l) + HCl(J) (α)

Xe(31f) + HCl(J) → Xe(nl) + HCl(J-1) if J≤5 (β)

Xe(31f) + HCl(J) → Xe^{+} + e^{−} + HCl(J-1) if J>5 (γ)

The total rate constant is k_{T} = (11.3 ± 3.0)×10^{–7} cm^{3}s^{−1}, divided into the following:

k_{α} = (5.5 ± 2.5)×10^{–7} cm^{3}s^{−1} (l-changing)

k_{β} = (4.8 ± 2.4)×10^{–7} cm^{3}s^{−1} (n-changing)

k_{γ} = (0.9 ± 0.4)×10^{–7} cm^{3}s^{−1} (ionisation)

Note that the reaction (γ) produces an important XeCl precursor, namely Xe^{+}.

====== Conclusions ======
Harpoon reactions play an important role in laser kinetics.

For Xe_{2}Cl lasers, the situation is simple when reacted with CCl_{4}. For the XeCl laser, the harpooning kinetics is more complex. Despite its weak proportion in a gaseous mixture, Cl_{2} is produced much effectively from the exciplex through harpooning. The 6s states do not come into play in the production of XeCl_{*} to the extent that they give rise to collisions with molecules of vibrationally excited HCl.

The kinetics of the vibrational excitation of HCl is therefore fundamental. At least the first six levels of vibration should be taken into consideration in order to build a satisfactory model. This vibrational excitation is produced by the following electrons:

HCl(v) + e^{−} → HCl(v’) + e^{−} (EV) with rate constant K.

The rate constants of (EV) were measured for the following transitions: v=0→v’=1, v=0→v’=2, v=1→ v’=2 et v=2→v’=3. An empirical law can then be proposed:

K_{v→v+1} = v K_{0→1}

K_{v→v+2} = v K_{0→2}

The values for K are dependent on the electron energy distribution as shown in Figure 4.

In the harpoon reactions, the rate of synthesis of the B state with respect to that of the C state is included between 1 and 2 whatever the nature of the rare gas halide. Nevertheless, one notices a clear increase in the proportion of state B with respect to state C when pressure increases. This relation is also strongly influenced by the nature of the chlorine donor. It is 1.2 for CCl_{4} and 1.3 for Cl_{2}. The excitation state of xenon is important. For the case of Cl_{2}, it was observed that the rate of synthesis of the B state could be five times higher than the C state if Xe(6p[1/2]_{0}) takes part in the reaction than if they in strongly excited states.

Other reactions are involved in the reactive collisions between neutral species but they play a negligible role.

===== Reactions involving excited molecular species =====
====== The role of xenon molecules ======
It is difficult to find reactions involving the molecules of xenon and HCL in published literature.

Lorents only measured the rate constant of decomposition of Xe_{2}^{*} by HCl as (8.2 ± 0.8)×10^{–10} cm^{3}s^{−1} without stating the resulting products.

In contrast, Bibinov et Vinogradov observed the following reaction with Cl_{2}:

Xe_{2}^{*} + Cl_{2} → XeCl_{*} + Cl + Xe

Exciplex synthesis was by harpooning. The rate constant was estimated at 7.1×10^{−10} cm^{3}s^{−1}.

====== The role of excited HCl ======
Castillejo et al. observed an HCl emission between 200 and 240 nm due to the B transition B(^{1}Σ^{+}) → X (^{1}Σ^{+}) (see figure 5). This emission disappears with increase in the pressure of xenon and XeCl(B) appears. In other words, XeCl(B) could be synthesized by the reaction:

HCl (B ^{1}Σ^{+}) + Xe (^{1}S_{O}) → XeCl(B) + H

The rate constant is estimated at 5×10^{−10} cm^{3}s^{−1}.

Another output pathway seems competitive to exciplex synthesis within the same collision which product should be:

Xe^{+} + H + Cl + e^{−} and the associated rate constant associated is 1×10^{−10} cm^{3}s^{−1}.

====== The role of excited Cl_{2} ======
Cl_{2} is synthesized in the laser through the following reaction:

Cl^{*} + HCl → Cl_{2}^{*} + Cl

The rate constant is 1×10^{−10} cm^{3}s^{−1}. Exciplex synthesis occurs through the following reaction:

Xe + Cl_{2}^{*}(^{1}Σ_{u}^{+}) → XeCl_{*}+ Cl with rate constant k_{u}

The values of k_{u} are given in table 14. The results from Zuev et al. is statistically distant from the others although recent. Ignoring it, the average value should be k_{u} = 2.6×10^{−10} cm^{3}s^{−1}.

Table 14 : Values of k_{u} in cm^{3}s^{−1}
| k_{u} × 10^{−10} | Reference |
|---|---|
| 1.1 | |
| (1.2 ± 0.2) | |
| (3.0 ± 0.5) | |
| 18 | |
| 5 | |

A corresponding reaction could be found for the Cl_{2}^{*} (D’ ^{3}π_{2g}) state.

===== Termolecular reactions =====
They are essentially produced in ternary mixtures and are of the type:

Xe** + Cl_{2} + M → XeCl_{*} + Cl + M with rate constant k_{c}

The rate constant k_{c} is given in table 15. Notice only the processes where M=Ar are negligible.

Table 15 : Values of k_{c} in cm^{6}s^{−1}.
| State of xenon Xe** | M = Xe × 10^{−28} | M = Ar × 10^{−28} |
|---|---|---|
| (6p[1/2]_{0}) | (3.5 ± 0.5) | < 0.5 |
| (6p[3/2]_{2}) | (1.4 ± 0.5) | < 0.1 |
| (6p[5/2]_{2}) | (1.8 ± 0.5) | < 0.1 |

As for helium, there are two reactions:

Xe* + Cl + He → XeCl_{*} + He

Xe** + Cl + He → XeCl_{*} + He

The rate constants are respectively, 10^{−27} cm^{6}s^{−1} and 3×10^{−27} cm^{6}s^{−1}.

There also exist data where the xenon atoms are at the ground state:

Xe + Cl + M → XeCl (X) + M where M = Ne or Xe

In both cases, the rate constant is: 1.2×10^{−33} cm^{6}s^{−1}.

===== Other reactions =====
Chlorine, Cl_{2}, synthesized in a gaseous mixture could induce the following reactions:

Xe + Cl_{2} → XeCl_{2}

Xe* + Cl_{2} + Xe → Xe^{+} + Cl_{2}^{−} + Xe → (XeCl_{2})^{*} + Xe

As the sublimation temperature of XrCl_{2} is t_{s}= 80 °C, this molecule is synthesized at room temperature, in the solid state within the gaseous mixture. This causes a parasitic lasing phenomenon called "laser snow".

Some authors have proposed increasing the temperature to make XeCl_{2} sublime. It then becomes reactive and actively participates in the synthesis of XeCl_{*} :

XeCl_{2}^{*} → XeCl_{*} + Cl

Xe* + XeCl_{2} → 2 XeCl_{*}

The temperature increase procures two advantages: to eliminate the parasitic laser phenomenon and increase XrCl production. However, the increase should not be of much importance so that XeCl_{2} does not dissociate which would destroy the preceding reaction.

In ternary mixtures, RgCl exciplexes could be synthesized, possibly leading to the formation of XeCl_{*} through so-called displacement reactions. They have been observed when the Rg is Ar or Kr:

RgCl^{*} + Xe → XeCl_{*} + Rg with rate constant k_{d} or k_{d}=1.5×10^{−10} cm^{3}s^{−1} for Rg = Ar

Inversely, RgCl synthesis consumes the available chlorine reducing the rate of XeCl production. The laser quality may be negatively affected as was the case with krypton.

This review will be limited to synthetic reactions of XeCl_{*}, excluding ionic recombination. A second pathway exists and will be considered.

==== Ion recombination ====
According to several authors bimolecular reactions (Xe^{+} + Cl^{−}, Xe2+ + Cl^{−} and RgXe^{+} + Cl^{−}) are not involved.

Ternary reactions are typically:

Xe^{+} + Cl^{−} + Rg → XeCl_{*} + Rg (3)

Xe^{+}_{2} + Cl^{−} + Rg → XeCl_{*} + Rg + Xe (4)

RgXe^{+} + Cl^{−} + Rg → XeCl_{*} + 2 Rg (5)

Xenon ions are synthesized directly in the discharge or through successive reactions that involve Rg^{+}, Rg^{2+} as well as other ionic or excited species. Figure 1 gives an example where Rg=Ne and figure 6 where Rg=He.

The Cl^{−} ions are basically formed by dissociative attachment from an HCl electron:

HCl(v) + e^{−} → H + Cl^{−} (AD)

In that same case, the rate constant (AD) depends on the energy distribution of the electrons as illustrated in Figure 4.

The third element Rg is passive chemically. It only serve to stabilize the reaction. Therefore, the authors only took the recombination rates of the positive and negative ions into consideration. These vary in a significant way with the total pressure of the gaseous mixture, the buffer gas and temperature.

Reactions (3) and (4) were experimentally demonstrated for all the rare gases. Figure 7 and Figure 8 show the influence of the buffer gas and pressure on the rate of recombination of these reactions when helium and then neon are utilized as buffer gases. This rate of recombination is of the same order of magnitude in both cases, of about some 10^{−6} cm^{3}s^{−1}. Apparently the influence of temperature has only been studied for neon. (See Figure 9.) The rate of recombination α_{3} in reaction (3) is at maximum at 180K for an absolute pressure of 294.2 kPa. α_{3} is therefore 4.2×10^{−6} cm^{3}s^{−1}.

The more refined analysis of reaction (4) was carried out by Bates et Morgan. who found that the Monte-Carlo method, Flannery's equation and Langevin's theory can give good results only when the pressure is above 1 atm. This is the norm for lasers. The proposed "tidal" theory agrees with the experimental measurements of Mezyk et al. which is evident in Figure 10. The rate of recombination α_{4} for reaction (4) is of the same order of magnitude as α_{3}.

Reaction (5) is only observed when Rg is neon or argon. For this reaction, the evolution of the rate of recombination α_{5} in the presence of pressurized neon is shown in figure 6. Imada et al. studied the influence of temperature for a fixed total pressure of 294 kPa. The maximum value of α_{5} is obtained at 120K and α_{5} = 7.5×10^{−6} cm^{3}s^{−1}.

For argon only two estimations are available at room temperature. At a pressure of 2 atm, α_{5} = 2.10^{−6} cm^{3}s^{−1} and at a pressure of 1 atm, α_{5} is 1×10^{−6} cm^{3}s^{−1}.

Reaction (5) does not favor a transitory complex RgXeCl_{*} as an intermediate stage. The following reaction, therefore, plays a minor role:

RgXe^{+} + Cl^{−} + Rg → RgXeCl_{*} + Rg → XeCl_{*} + 2 Rg

On the contrary, the principal synthetic pathway is given by:

RgXe^{+} + Cl^{−} + Rg → 2 Rg + Xe^{+} + Cl^{−} → XeCl_{*} + 2Rg

Kannari et al.. estimated the contribution of each of the three recombination and harpooning reactions for three types of mixtures. The results are shown in Table 16. Reaction (3) provides the bulk of the exciplex molecules and generally the harpooning reactions play a secondary role. When helium is used, in contrast, the harpooning reactions contributes about 10–15% of XeCl_{*} synthesis. Other authors only estimate this contribution at 1% when the ionic pathway is involved. These theoretical conclusions are confirmed by experimental methods for the generality of the buffer gases and for other chlorine donors. The "harpoon" reactions, notwithstanding, are important despite their low contributions. These harpoon reactions are the reactions which are set in motion after the first excitation. Ionic recombinations, which then provide the bulk of the exciplex molecules, kick off 20 ns later.

Table 16 : Percentage contributions of the synthetic reactions for XeCl_{*} for excitation with 55 ns pulses at ~3 MW/cm^{3}.
| Reaction | Xe/HCl | Ar/Xe/HCl | Ne/Xe/HCl |
|---|---|---|---|
| Xe^{+} + Cl^{−} | 83.1% | 81.5% | 69.6% |
| Xe_{2}^{+} + Cl^{−} | 11.9 | 8.2 | 9.5 |
| MXe^{+} + Cl^{−} | | 6.3 | 11.1 |
| Xe** + HCl | 2.5 | 1.4 | 1.4 |
| Xe* + HCl(v) | 2.5 | 2.6 | 2.6 |
| Others | | | 5.8 |

In table 16, the column named "others" shows 5.8% for neon, meaning that other recombination pathways are possible.

Xe3+ ions are synthesized in the gaseous mixtures used in lasers. These ions react with Cl^{-10−} in order to produce XeCl. Nevertheless, this reaction is only a little contribution to the kinetics of the laser.

Xe+* ions react with Cl^{−} in order to produce XeCl_{*}. Alekhin et al. have also synthesized XeCl_{*} using NaCl vapors. XeCl_{*} is the product of the lowest vibrational states (v≤20) using highly excited Xe* ions in a bimolecular reaction. The rate of synthesis is estimated to be between 2×10^{−10} and 1×10^{−9} cm^{3}s^{−1}. A corresponding reaction is proposed using HCl. This conclusion is based on the presence of the states which are responsible for the third continuum of xenon – only Xe2+ ions, since XeCl_{*} is not produced. On the contrary, Xe* ion participation in the reaction is compatible with the observations of other authors. Several authors have confirmed the presence of Xe* ions (6s ^{4}P_{3/2}) in the laser mixtures. Their concentration is a thousand times greater than that of Xe* ions in the harpoon reaction. On the other hand, the concentration of these ions and that of XeCl_{*} and Cl^{−} as a factor of time is not incompatible with the synthesis of exciplex molecules using Xe^{+}. The beginning of the decline in Xe+* and Cl^{−} is related to an increasing acceleration of the rate of synthesis of XeCl_{*}. The distribution during harpoon reactions between states B and C occurs in random proportions in experimental conditions.

The first estimate of the ionic pathways was made by Tysone and Hoffman who suggested 76% for states B and 24% for states C. Successively, the buffer gases are neon, argon and krypton. Ohwa and Kushner published similar values: 77% for states B and 23% for states C. They used a quaternary mixture containing a buffer gas (using neon) from hydrogen, H_{2}.

A recent and more detailed study was conducted by Tsuji et al. in a mixture of helium as buffer gas. They found that:

– States D are especially formed from Xe^{+} ion, (^{2}P_{1/2}) ;

– States B and C are exclusively produced from Xe^{+} ion (^{2}P_{3/2}) in the following proportions: States B – 62.6% and States C – 38.4%. The rate of production of XeCl_{*} is 98%. There is then few competing reactions.

In laboratory experiments, the number of the Xe^{+}(^{2}P_{1/2}) and Xe^{+}(^{2}P_{3/2}) states are the same. In addition, the rate constants of reaction (3) relative to these two states of xenon are similar. However, under these conditions, the number of states D formed is very low with respect to the number of states B and C. The rate of XeCl(D) formation with respect to XeCl(B, C) is estimated at 0.033±0.006. The faster dissociation of [Xe^{+}(^{2}P_{1/2})Cl^{−}]^{*} with respect to that of [Xe^{+}(^{2}P_{3/2})Cl^{−}]^{*} is responsible for this situation.

=== Pathways of decomposition ===
==== Radiation ====
===== Emission spectra =====
The corresponding spectra demonstrated in Figure 11 was observed by virtually all authors who studied mixtures that were based on xenon and a chlorine donor.

Two theoretical studies have enabled identification of the emission spectra. Five transitions have heightened intensities that correspond to ΔΩ = 0 i.e., a parallel polarization to the internuclear axis. The starting states are always ionic and the product states are covalent. The characteristics of these emissions are as shown in Table 17.

Table 17. XeCl_{*} emissions.
| Transition | Experiment | Theory | Theory | Theory |
|---|---|---|---|---|
| | Observed wavelength(nm) | Computed wavelength of emission (nm) | Time for transition (s) | Probability of emission (s^{−1})× 10^{7} |
| B → X | 308 | 295; 282 | 2.76; 2.85 | 9.3; 11.4 |
| D → X | 235.5 | 224; 216 | 1.94; 2.09 | 10; 14 |
| C → A_{3/2} | 345 | 330; 306; 355 | 0.96; 0.98 | 0.81; 1.05 |
| B → A_{1/2} | 345 | 324; 307 | 0.87; 0.88 | 0.6; 0.84 |
| D → A_{1/2} | Non-observed | 242; 233 | 0.50; 0.49 | 0.56; 0.59 |

The most probable UV transitions are the B→X and D→X. They have the Σ→Σ type. The other transitions, B→A, C→A and D→A, have the nature Π→Π and are much less probable.

Other theoretically weaker transitions have not yet resulted in an observation with the exception of Hay and Dunning, who made provisions for four transitions that are perpendicularly polarized at the internuclear axis; in other words, with ΔΩ = ±1. Only Ewing and Brau noted an emission centered at 425 nm attributed to a ^{2}Σ→^{2}Π transition. Finally, Krauss suggested the possibility of an emission of the D→B type whose transition period is itself very weak. Table 6 places this at 931 nm.

The principal emissions were observed and reported as in Table 17.

The B→X line is observed at 308 nm (Figure 11) while the theoretical prediction of its existence was clearly weak. This is the narrowest emission and the final state shows a somewhat shallow potential well. Just like the rare gas halides, this emission has the strongest transition period. That is why it is the preferred emission in XeCl lasers.

Experimentally, the (C→A) and (B→A) lines overlap, producing a continuum centered at 345 nm, often of low amplitude as can be observed in Figure 11. The width of the emission depends on the transition tending to a strongly repulsive state. Koltz et al. placed this continuum at between 312 and 460 nm. The weak observed intensities are attributed to the weakness of the probabilities of the transition of the two emissions opposite that of the B→X and by the small amounts of states C formed with respect to states B as was previously seen. Other authors have called attention to the absorption phenomena of molecule Xe_{2}Cl at this wavelength. According to Kannari et al., reaction (3) is the principal pathway for synthesis of states B and C. Tsuji et al. estimated the proportions of states B and C formed: 38% for state C and 62% state B. The value of the transition probabilities (theoretical value of I_{B→A}/I_{B→X} = 0.07; experimental value of 0.05), so the contribution of (B→A) emission is about 10%. Several authors claimed that a laser based on the 345 nm emission could be developed, especially at pressures of about 10 atmospheres when states B and C are thermalized. Meanwhile, no concrete result had been discovered as of 2014.

The (D→X) transition centered at 235.5 nm has not been systematically observed. The corresponding line appears weak as in the case in Figure 12. Its optical width is similar to that of (B→X) emission because it leads to the same weakly bound state of X. In contrast, the relative intensity of the (B→X) and (D→X) emissions considerably vary from one author to the other: I_{D→X}/I_{B→X} = 1/3 by Shuker, 1/25 to 1/50 by Sur et al. and 0.14 by Taylor et al.. The latter authors noted that the relation is pressure-independent. It remains unlikely that a laser could be developed using this transition as Shuker had predicted.

The spectra did not show any D→A emission. Nevertheless, Hassal et Ballik saw a line at 246 nm with very weak intensity (figure 12) without attributing it to the transition under consideration.

State D emissions are negligible for XeCl spectroscopy. Attributing the absence of D→A as for D→B to the weakly associated transition probability, the same cannot be said for D→X. From Table 17, the D→X emission should be of lesser intensity than B→X. In this case, the possible explanation could be due to the weak production of state D, either by the ionic pathway or by the harpoon reaction using states Xe(^{3}P). The principal path of XeCl_{*} synthesis is reaction (3) and the relation of the number of states B to that of state D is 0.053. From Table 17, it is likely that state D will de-excite exclusively towards state X. Table 17's transition probabilities show I_{D→X}/I_{B→X}≈6.2%, with results of the order of magnitude of Sur et al. and not far from that of Taylor et al..

These emissions are more or less degraded for short wavelengths as the emission spectrum of the (B→X) line shows in figure 13. A corresponding oscillation phenomenon with the same wavelength was observed in the absorption spectra. Besides, the (D→X) emission has the same line structure as (B→X).

The width and oscillatory nature of these lines are bound to the existence of transitions arising from high vibrational levels of excited radiative states. The vibrational excitation is a result of the energy left after exciplex molecule formation. This energy depends on both the state of the xenon atom/ion involved in the reaction and the halogen donor. For the 345 nm emission, the transitions at a high vibrational level are more dispersed towards the red region for C→A_{3/2} than for B→A_{1/2} because the repulsive barrier of A_{3/2} is steeper and closer to the higher state of the emission than is A_{1/2}.

The oscillatory nature of these spectra tends to disappear with an increase of pressure, showing only the peaks arising from the v≤2 level when the pressure is above 1 atm. This shows that the vibrational relaxation effectively depopulates the highest vibrational levels. On the other hand, the disappearance of the elevated levels is faster for state B than for state C because state C has a much longer lifetime. The vibrational relaxation of states B and C play an important role in the chemical kinetics of XeCl lasers.

Beyond 5 atm, these lines increase in width, possibly due to collisional enlargement induced by rays or due to the entire rotational structure.

The isotopic effects are negligible for xenon but marked for chlorine. The vibrational lines associated with the heaviest isotope ^{37}Cl are lightly displaced towards the greatest wavelengths. For example, the gap reads 1.51Å for the 4-0 line of B→X.

===== Radiative lifetimes of excited species =====
Values for states B, C and D are shown in Table 18 for the vibrational level v=0. These are states B and C which have resulted in more determinations.

Table 18. Lifetime (in ns) of XeCl_{*} states.
| State B : τ_{B} | State C : τ_{C} | State D : τ_{D} | Method | Reference |
|---|---|---|---|---|
| 11.1 ± 0.2 | 130.5 ± 1.5 | | Experimental (gas) | |
| 27 ± 3 | 53 ± 6 | | Experimental (gas) | |
| 10.1 | 123 | 9.5 | Theoretical | |
| 11.1 ± 0.2 | 131 ± 10 | | Experimental (gas) | |
| | 135 | | Experimental (gas) | |
| 8.2 | 95 | 6.9 | Theoretical | |
| | | 11 | Experimental (solid) | |
| | 133.5 ± 4.5 | | Experimental (solid) | |
| | 120 ± 9 | | Experimental (solid) | |
| 17 | | | Experimental (gas) | |

In state B, two values are statistically distant from the others. They correspond to the oldest measurements. Without taking them into account, the confidence interval obtained in ns is: 8<τ_{B}<12.3.

For state C, the dispersion is more important. Grieneisen et al.'s determination is still statistically distant from the others as well as the two theoretical values along with a measurement obtained at the solid state. When the above is disregarded, the confidence interval, in ns, then becomes: 129.1<τ_{C}<135.9.

Using average values, the relation τ_{B}/τ_{C} is 0.0764. It is adequately comparable with a direct measure which is 0.087 ± 0.009. This relation is important because it plays an important role in the vibrational relaxation of states B and C.

A systematic study of the lifetimes of several vibrational levels (v≤136) of states B and C was conducted as reported in Table 19.

Table 19. Lifetime of vibrational levels of states B and C of XeCl.
| Vibrational level | Energy (cm^{−1}); State C | Lifetime (ns) ; State C | Energy (cm^{−1}); State B | Lifetime (ns) ; State B |
|---|---|---|---|---|
| 0 | 139.42 | 120.0 | 369.42 | 11.0 |
| 4 | 876.08 | 127.6 | 1136.05 | 11.08 |
| 8 | 1590.86 | 136.4 | 1882.33 | 11.88 |
| 12 | 2284.25 | 137.2 | 2608.63 | 12.29 |
| 16 | 2956.77 | 142.8 | 3315.38 | 12.64 |
| 20 | 3608.94 | 146.9 | 4002.98 | 12.53 |
| 24 | 4241.29 | 152.3 | 4671.84 | 12.35 |
| 28 | 4854.33 | 174.1 | 5322.39 | 13.43 |
| 32 | 5448.6 | 182.1 | 5955.05 | 14.10 |
| 36 | 6024.61 | 195.3 | 6570.25 | 14.5 |
| 40 | 6582.89 | 195.5 | 7168.42 | 14.84 |
| 44 | 7123.96 | 210.3 | 7750.00 | 16.12 |
| 48 | 7648.33 | 224.6 | 8315.41 | 16.38 |
| 52 | 8156.52 | 230.6 | 8865.10 | 17.25 |
| 56 | 8649.03 | 245.0 | 9399.49 | 18.69 |
| 60 | 9126.35 | 256.4 | 9919.03 | 19.33 |
| 64 | 9588.98 | 265.0 | 10424.17 | 20.15 |
| 68 | 10037.4 | 275.2 | 10915.27 | 21.35 |
| 72 | 10472.1 | 279.1 | 11392.77 | 22.42 |
| 76 | 10883.4 | 270.2 | 11897.07 | 23.88 |
| 80 | 11302.0 | 296.2 | 12308.67 | 24.78 |
| 84 | 11698.1 | 298.2 | 12747.97 | 26.04 |
| 88 | 12082.3 | 308.3 | 13175.27 | 27.52 |
| 92 | 12454.9 | 318.1 | 13390.97 | 28.98 |
| 96 | 12815.3 | 325.6 | 13994.47 | 30.21 |
| 100 | 13167 | 337.7 | 14389.17 | 31.77 |
| 104 | 13507.3 | 343.3 | 14772.37 | 33.21 |
| 108 | 13837.6 | 349.1 | 15145.174 | 35.14 |
| 112 | 14158.1 | 352.8 | 15508.67 | 37.16 |
| 116 | 14469.3 | 357.9 | 15862.27 | 39.03 |
| 120 | 14771.5 | 375.1 | 16206.67 | 40.91 |
| 124 | 15065 | 398.5 | 16541.97 | |
| 128 | 15627.1 | 433.7 | 17186.47 | |
| 136 | 15896.2 | 438.5 | 17496.07 | |

Lifetimes increase by a factor of 4 when v goes from 0 to 100. A graphical extrapolation of the data relative to state B is shown in Figure 14.

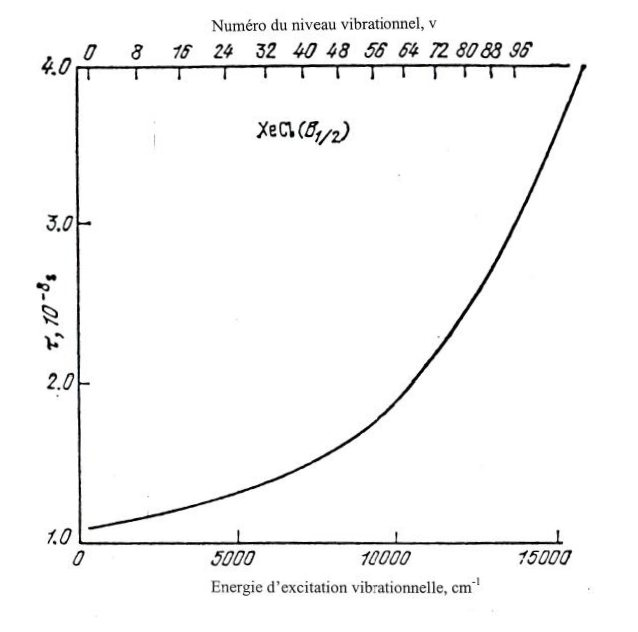
Figure 14. Radiative lifetimes of state B_{1/2} from XeCl excimer as a function of the vibrational excitation of the molecule tiré de Smirnov.

For state D, only three determinations are relatively close to one another. At the gaseous state, Shuker noted that D→X emission has a time-based dependence similar to B→X emission, which is in line with the previous magnitudes as the lifetime of the B state is of the order of 10 ns. However, other measures are necessary to precisely value τ_{D}.

==== The collisional pathway ====
The influences of xenon and HCl will be discussed first, followed by the role of the diverse buffer gases and of the chlorine donors.

===== Destruction of the XeCl_{*} molecule =====
====== In Xe/HCl mixtures ======
The only process of destruction of states B and C of XeCl, other than the radiative process, which has been proved is:

XeCl_{*} + HCl → Other products and not XeCl (6) with rate constant of k_{H}

XeCl_{*} + Xe → Other products and not XeCl (7) with rate constant of k_{X}

XeCl_{*} + 2 Xe → Other products and not XeCl and Xe_{2}Cl or → Xe_{2}Cl^{*} + Xe (8) with rate constant of k_{DX}

XeCl_{*} + Xe + HCl → Other products and not XeCl (9) with rate constant of k_{M}

XeCl_{*} + e^{−} → Xe + Cl + e^{−} (10) with rate constant of k_{e}

As of 2014 no result had been found for state D.

The values obtained for states B and C are collected in Table 20. The authors assume that the reaction rates are identical for the two states.

Table 20: Rate constants for disappearance of XeCl(B, C) in cm^{3}s^{−1} for k_{e}, k_{H} and k_{X} and in cm^{6}s^{−1} for k_{DX} and k_{M}.
| Ref | k_{H} | k_{X} | k_{DX} | k_{M} | k_{e} |
|---|---|---|---|---|---|
| | 1.4 × 10^{−9} (± 40%) | 3.2 × 10^{−11} (± 35%) | | | |
| | (6.3 ± 0.5) × 10^{−10} | (2.3 ± 0.3) × 10^{−11} | | | |
| | | | | | 4 × 10^{−8} |
| | | 0.4 × 10^{−11} | 1.3 × 10^{−30} | | |
| | (7.3 ± 0.1) × 10^{−10} | < 4 × 10^{−12} | (1.53 ± 0.1) × 10^{−30} | | |
| | | (5.0^{+3.0}_{−2.0}) × 10^{−12} | (13.0 ± 4.0) × 10^{−31} | | |
| | | | 7.3 × 10^{−31} | | |
| | | | | | 1.16 × 10^{−7} |
| | 1.7 × 10^{−9} | | 4 × 10^{−31} | | 1.2 × 10^{−7} |
| | (7.3 ± 0.1) × 10^{−10} | | | | |
| | | | 1.5 × 10^{−30} | | |
| | 7.7 × 10^{−10} | 2.1 × 10^{−12} | 1 × 10^{−30} | | |
| | (3.8 ± 2.3) × 10^{−10} | (4 ± 19) × 10^{−13} | (1.0 ± 0.4) × 10^{−30} | (4.6 ± 2.1) × 10^{−29} | |
| | | | 1.5 × 10^{−31} | | |
| | | | 5 × 10^{−31} | | 2 × 10^{−8} |
| | | | | | 3 × 10^{−7} |
| | | | | | 3 × 10^{−8} |
| | | | | | 2 × 10^{−7} |
| | | | | | 1 × 10^{−7} |

Reaction (9) has been observed only once, recently. Comparison data are therefore not available. In contrast, the other reactions have been repeatedly observed and quantified.

For k_{H}, three measures are statistically distant from the others. The last (older) two are superior to the others. The first, a recent measure, is the only experiment which proved process (9) which had been neglected. Measurements made by Rives et al., k_{H} must be multiplied by 2 which puts them at the same level as the other values. Taking reaction (9) into account, the set of values of k_{H} must be revised downward except for Rives et al.. A confidence interval is difficult to obtain in these conditions.

For k_{X}, a statistical analysis is very difficult because of the high dispersion of significant absolute values of doubled uncertainties. Lorents provided only an upper limit. Rives et al. results leave open to question whether this process is computable, considering its weak rate constant. Statistically, k_{X}, should not surpass 6.12×10^{−12} cm^{3}s^{−1}. One other (old) measure, had already provided an erroneous value for k_{H}. Another measure was strongly revised downwards six years later.

Reaction (8) which does not lead to the production of Xe_{2}Cl^{*} is of negligible importance. The measurements given for k_{DX} are well dispersed and the confidence interval contains only three values. Two of the excluded measurements are of doubtful estimations, while the others are correspondingly direct measures that provided good results. Hanging over k_{DX} is a great uncertainty, but the average value is representative of the overall results, that is, 9.1×10^{−31} cm^{6}s^{−1}.

The measured values of k_{e} display a strong dispersion. Only four values are statistically close The average value of 9.6×10^{−8} cm^{3}s^{−1} is relatively close to the only direct measure.

Lou also suggested other products for reaction (10):

XeCl_{*} + e^{−} → Xe^{+} + Cl^{−} (k_{e1} = 1.8×10^{−7} cm^{3}s^{−1}) or → Xe* + Cl + e^{−} (k_{e2} = 1.2×10^{−7} cm^{3}s^{−1})

Some differences were noticed for reactions of type (6) accounting for the vibrational levels of the collision partners:

XeCl_{*}(v=0) + HCl(v=1) → Xe + HCl + Cl + Cl (6a) with rate constant of k_{Ha}

XeCl_{*}(v=0) + HCl(v=2) → Xe + HCl + Cl + Cl (6b) with rate constant of k_{Hb}

XeCl(B,C;v≠0) + HCl(v=0) → Other products and not XeCl (6c) with rate constant of k_{Hc}

The values of the rate constants are summarized in Table 21. They are well dispersed and do not correspond to any direct measurement. These values are specifically based on analogous estimations.

Table 21. Values of k_{Ha}, k_{Hb}, k_{Hc} in cm^{3}s^{−1}.
| Ref | k_{Ha} | k_{Hb} | k_{Hc} |
|---|---|---|---|
| | 7.7 × 10^{−10} | | |
| | 6.3 × 10^{−10} | | |
| | 1.4 × 10^{−9} | | |
| | 7.7 × 10^{−9} | 7.7 × 10^{−9} | |
| | | 7.7 × 10^{−10} | |
| | | 6.3 × 10^{−10} | |
| | | | 6.3 × 10^{−10} |

Reactions that correspond to reactions (6) and (7) are evident when XeCl is in the ground state of X(v=0). These phenomena affect laser performance and are therefore important. The rate constants are assembled in Table 22. These rates do not vary with the vibrational level of the colliding molecules. Only one direct measurement exists; the others are estimates.

Table 22. Rate constants of disappearance in cm^{3}s^{−1} through binary collisions. The results are relative to XeCl(X, v = 0) along with another partner, either of Xe, HCl and an electron.
| Ref | Xe | HCl | e^{−} |
|---|---|---|---|
| | (5.6 ± 0.8) × 10^{−12} | (2.2 ± 0.5) × 10^{−11} | |
| | 2.2 × 10^{−11} | 5.6 × 10^{−10} | |
| | 8 × 10^{−12} | | 2 × 10^{−8} |
| | | | 7 × 10^{−8} |

====== Role of the buffer gas ======
The addition of a third gas in significant quantities also affects the kinetics of disappearance of XeCl(B,C). It induces reactions which are similar to those produced by xenon:

Double collision (11) : XeCl(B,C) + Rg → Xe + Cl + Rg rate constant of k_{11}

Triple collision (12) : XeCl(B,C) + 2 Rg → Xe + Cl + 2 Rg rate constant of k_{12}

Mixed triple collision (13) : XeCl(B,C) + Xe + Rg → 2 Xe + Cl + Rg rate constant of k_{13}

The rate constants of the three processes are grouped in tables 23–25.

Table 23. Values of k_{11} in cm^{3}s^{−1} for the different rare gases.
| Ref | He | Ne | Ar | Kr |
|---|---|---|---|---|
| | (1.1 ± 0.2) × 10^{−12} | (0.76 ±0.15) × 10^{−12} | (1.8 ± 0.5) × 10^{−12} | (4.0 ± 0.6) × 10^{−12} |
| | 5 × 10^{−13} | | | |
| | 1 × 10^{−12} | | | |
| | | (1.0 ± 0.3) × 10^{−12} | | |
| | | 3.3 × 10^{−13} | | |
| | | 10^{−11} | | |
| | | | < 2 × 10^{−13} | |

Reactions (11) and (13) are always important while reaction (12) has a negligible contribution. The results are greatly dispersed. Differences may reach orders of magnitude. Four references have resulted in direct measurements of reaction rates. Others are estimates. These are based on correspondences and only indicative. No information is available for krypton.

Table 24. Values of k_{12} in cm^{6}s^{−1} for different rare gases.
| Ref | He | Ne | Ar | Kr |
|---|---|---|---|---|
| | | | < 3 × 10^{−33} | |
| | 5 × 10^{−34} | | | |
| | 5 × 10^{−32} | | | |
| | | 1 × 10^{−33} | | |
| | | < 1 × 10^{−33} | | |
| | | 1 × 10^{−34} | | |

Competitive reactions are evident for the totality of these reactions.

Table 25. Values of k_{13} in cm^{6}s^{−1} for different rare gases.
| Ref | He | Ne | Ar | Kr |
|---|---|---|---|---|
| | | | (3.8 ± 0.2) × 10^{−30} | |
| | (2.4 ± 0.5) × 10^{−31} | (7.4 ± 1.5) × 10^{−31} | (8.9 ± 1.9) × 10^{−31} | (9.9 ± 1.9) × 10^{−31} |
| | | | (1.01 ± 0.05) × 10^{−30} | |
| | 1.5 × 10^{−32} | 1.5 × 10^{−31} | | |
| | | 5 × 10^{−32} | | |
| | | 1 × 10^{−31} | | |
| | 1.5 × 10^{−31} | | | |
| | | 2 × 10^{−31} | | |

The reactions of (11) are competitive for displacement reactions. In this case, the products are RgCl(B). They have only been observed in the case where Rg = Kr:

XeCl_{*} + Kr → KrCl + Xe

The rate constant is 0.7×10^{−9} cm^{3}s^{−1}. Therefore, this reaction is more effective than quenching. It plays an important role in laser kinetics. It is also as fast as the process of creation of XeCl_{*} by harpoon reaction. Table 20 concerns one of the principal pathways of destruction of the exciplex molecule.

For Brashears et al., it is possible to obtain the triatomic complex, RgXeCl_{*}, as product. This is a competitive reaction when collisions that produce dissociated atoms occur. Emissions of KrXeCl at 370 nm have been observed, along with ArXeCl at 326 nm and NeXeCl at 434 nm. The rate constants have not been measured, except for Rg=Kr, which is 9×10^{−33} cm^{6}s^{−1}.

However, the creation of ArXeCl seems to be preferential by a competitive reaction (13):

Xe* + Ar + Xe → ArXeCl_{*}

The rate constant is 4×10^{−30} cm^{6}s^{−1}. It is then of the same order of magnitude as (13).

However, the synthesis of the Xe_{2}Cl^{*} trimer is the most frequent competitive reaction of (13).

For helium, Baginskii et al. provided a solution using Xe^{*}_{2} + Cl + He of which the rate constant is 1.5×10^{−31} cm^{6}s^{−1}.

A corresponding reaction for (11) was demonstrated for XeCl at the ground state. The rate constants are summarized in Table 26. The measurements are greatly dispersed (only one is direct) and data on krypton are absent. The others are based, more or less, on estimates. Amongst these, one is statistically distant from the others. On using neon, the rate constant for XeCl(X, v=1) has been estimated as 1×10^{−11} cm^{3}s^{−1}.

Table 26. Rate constants of disappearance in cm^{3}s^{−1} through binary collisions relative to XeCl(X, v=0) for various buffer gases.
| Ref | He | Ne | Ar | Kr |
|---|---|---|---|---|
| | 5 × 10^{−12} | | | |
| | 9.8 × 10^{−11} | | | |
| | 3 × 10^{−12} | | | |
| | | (1.0 ± 0.15) × 10^{−13} | (0.6 ± 0.06) × 10^{−13} | |
| | | 1 × 10^{−11} | | |
| | | 1 × 10^{−12} | | |
| | | 8 × 10^{−12} | | |
| | | 5 × 10^{−11} | | |

====== Other chlorine donors and other reactions ======
The main reactions are those corresponding to reaction (6):

XeCl_{*} + RCl → Other products and not XeCl (14) rate constant of k_{R}

The values of the rate constants through RCl = Cl_{2} or CCl_{4} are summarized in table 27. The three chlorine donors studied (HCl, Cl_{2} and CCl_{4}) have rates of quenching of the same order of magnitude.

Table 27. Rate constants in cm^{3}s^{−1} relative to reactions (14) for XeCl (B, C ; v’ = 0,1).
| Ref | Cl_{2} | CCl_{4} |
|---|---|---|
| | (4.3 ± 0.2) × 10^{−10} | |
| | (5.6 ± 0.25) × 10^{−10} | |
| | 5 × 10^{−10} | |
| | 5.9 × 10^{−10} | |
| | 5.8 × 10^{−10} | |
| | | (4.6 ± 0.2) × 10^{−10} |

All the measurements in Table 27 were experimental. For chlorine, only one (recent) value is statistically distant from the others. The absolute difference is not very great versus the other determinations. An average value for k_{R} for chlorine is 5×10^{−10} cm^{3}s^{−1}, which is very close to a measure relative to CCl_{4}.

For chlorine, Grieneisen et al. pointed to two different values for the rate constant for states B and C. They were respectively estimated as (8.8 ± 1.5)×10^{−10} cm^{3}s^{−1} and (3.3 ± 0.3)×10^{−10} cm^{3}s^{−1}. This is a direct measure of the process of destruction through binary collision with Cl_{2} that includes all the phenomena and not just quenching. As states B and C are energetically close, collisional coupling is acting on the two states. A similar result for xenon seems to reinforce this hypothesis.

Some atoms of free chlorine exist in the conditions which matter for lasers. The following quenching reactions is provided for:

XeCl_{*} + Cl → Xe + 2Cl

Two authors have estimated the rate constant: 1.4×10^{−9} cm^{3}s^{−1} and 8×10^{−10} cm^{3}s^{−1}.

The presence of impurities, I_{m}, such as the chlorocarbons (the consequence of corrosion), NO, CO_{2}, O_{2}, CO, N_{2}O, H_{2}O could have an effect on the chemical kinetics of disappearance of XeCl_{*} since binary collisions I_{m}–XeCl_{*} possess rate constants of the order of 3×10^{−10} cm^{3}s^{−1}, thus making them comparable to the XeCl_{*} + RCl reaction. However, given the usual impurity levels, the reaction frequencies are negligible. A practical solution has been proposed to eliminate them that involves introducing 1 torr of H_{2}.

===== Process of collisional coupling between states B and C =====
====== In binary mixtures of Xe/HCl ======
The weak energetic gap (about 100 cm^{−1}) between these two states (Table 2), suggests that a coupling was produced. However, this result was not exactly quantified nor was it later confirmed. No collisional coupling phenomenon induced by chlorine has been detected recently.

The role of electrons is also not well known in the coupling process. According to Finn et al., its role is negligible, although Johnson et al. gave an elevated rate constant. This rate is the same, according to them, for B to C and C to B transfers. The energy difference between B and C is not zero (see Table 2). The reaction rate was estimated at 2×10^{−8} cm^{3}s^{−1}.

These couplings are demonstrated through binary collisions using an atom of xenon:

XeCl(B ; v’ = 0) + Xe → XeCl(C ; v’ = 0,1) + Xe (15) rate constant of k_{BC}

XeCl(C ; v’ = 0, 1) + Xe → XeCl(B ; v’ = 0) + Xe (16) rate constant of k_{CB}

The measurements of rate constants are not very consistent as can be seen in Table 28.

Table 28. Rate constants in cm^{3}s^{−1} of the collisional coupling processes of states B and C.
| Ref | k_{BC} | k_{CB} |
|---|---|---|
| | (11.0 ± 0.3) × 10^{−11} | (7.4 ± 0.3) × 10^{−11} |
| | 13.5 × 10^{−11} | 15 × 10^{−11} |
| | (7.21 ± 1.97) × 10^{−12} | (4.08 ± 1.97) × 10^{−12} |
| | 5 × 10^{−11} | |

r In experiments by Inoue et al., the vibrational levels v’=0.1 were directly excited. This is not the case in other experiments. The last value is only a theoretical estimation based on similarities with other reactions. The energetic gap ΔE = E_{B} – E_{C} deduced from k_{CB} and k_{BC}, suggests that further information could follow. Assuming that the states E_{B} and E_{C} were thermalized:

k_{BC}/k_{CB} = exp(ΔE/kT) since the statistical weights of the two states are the same.

ΔE, was also inferred by Inoue et al. as 85 cm^{−1}, and as 119 cm^{−1} by Rives et al., while 22 cm^{−1} was the measurement given by Le Calvé et al. (see Table 2). Only the first two values are values of ΔE which are compatible with 100 cm^{−1}, the accepted order of magnitude. A clear difference exists between these two; an order of magnitude separates the values of k_{BC} and k_{CB} in the two experiments. Grieneisen et al. provided only the global rate of destruction of states B and C, in other words, quenching and coupling. For the destruction of state C, they found (15.5 ± 0.9)×10^{−12} cm^{3}s^{−1} and for state B (10.3 ± 0.9)×10^{−12} cm^{3}s^{−1}, which are intermediate values between those of Inoue et al. and Rives et al.. Recall that quenching by xenon only has a weak influence (Table 20). Inoue et al. notably did not take account of reaction (9). If the same approach is taken for the results by Rives et al., the values of k_{BC} and k_{CB} are close to those of Inoue et al.. As was explained for k_{x} and k_{H}, taking account of the process (9) modifies the values of the reaction rate. On this point, Rives et al. is more precise than Inoue et al..

The advantage of Inoue et al.'s result was in vibrational resolution, as k_{BC} and k_{CB} vary with the vibrational level v. For level v=70 to 130, rate constants between 15 and 20×10^{−11} cm^{3}s^{−1} were observed. k_{BC} and k_{CB} seems to then grow with v.

Since most of the time XeCl(B, C) is formed with a strong vibrational excitation, knowledge of the exact estimate of the variation of k_{BC} and k_{CB} with v; and the chemical kinetics of the vibrational relaxation and its importance relative vis-à-vis to the coupling process are important.

====== The role of the buffer gas ======
Collisional coupling is produced by binary collisions with an atom of a rare gas, Rg:

XeCl(B) + Rg → XeCl(C) + Rg (17) rate constant of k_{BC}^{Rg}

XeCl(C) + Rg → XeCl(B) + Rg (18) rate constant of k_{CB}^{Rg}

Dreiling and Setser provide order of magnitude values for k_{BC}^{Rg} and k_{CB}^{Rg} for a given vibrational level. The results are shown in Table 29. This shows that the rate constants increase regularly when the vibrational level, v, of XeCl_{*} is higher and the rare gas, Rg, is heavier.

Table 29. Coupling rate constants in cm^{3}s^{−1} by binary collisions using an atom of rare gas.
| v | He | Ne | Ar | Kr |
|---|---|---|---|---|
| 0–30 | (0.5 to 1.8) × 10^{−11} | (0.7 to 2.6) × 10^{−11} | (3.0 to 11) × 10^{−11} | (3.0 to 11) × 10^{−11} |
| 30–70 | (1.8 to 2.5) × 10^{−11} | (2.6 to 3.5) × 10^{−11} | (11 to 15) × 10^{−11} | (11.0 to 16) × 10^{−11} |
| 70–130 | 2.5 × 10^{−11} | 3.5 × 10^{−11} | 15 × 10^{−11} | 16 × 10^{−11} |

Using helium, experiments have been made at low and high pressures. At high pressures, the transfer constants are of the order of (1.5 ± 0.7)×10^{−12} cm^{3}s^{−1} and at low pressures 3.0×10^{−11} cm^{3}s^{−1}. A strong pressure induces a vibrational relaxation such that the values of v involved in the transfer are weak and vice versa for weak pressures. The only available direct determination for k_{BC}^{He} gives a value less than 3×10^{−13} cm^{3}s^{−1}.

For neon, the values of the rate of transfer at low and high pressure are respectively, 3.0×10^{−11} cm^{3}s^{−1} and (0.8 ± 0.4)×10^{−12} cm^{3}s^{−1}. They are inferior to those of Table 29. The direct measurement of the rate constant k_{BC}^{Ne} gives a value less than 3.10^{−13} cm^{3}s^{−1}. Finally, according to Ohwa, the order of magnitude of the two rate of coupling constants would be 4.8×10^{−12} cm^{3}s^{−1} for v=4.

For argon, the results increase. At low pressures, the order of magnitude would only be 6.0×10^{−11} cm^{3}s^{−1}. Other authors published rates of transfer of 1.2 ± 0.4×10^{−4} cm^{3}s^{−1} for a pressure interval starting from 10 to 1000 torr. Direct measurements of k_{BC}^{Ar} and k_{CB}^{Ar} are available without specifying the vibrational levels involved:

k_{BC}^{Ar} = 36×10^{−4} cm^{3}s^{−1} and k_{CB}^{Ar} = 21×10^{−11} cm^{3}s^{−1}

Meanwhile, Yu et al. noted a variation with temperature of k_{BC}^{Ar}:

k_{BC}^{Ar} = (4 ± 2)×10^{−12} cm^{3}s^{−1} at 300K and k_{BC}^{Ar} = (2 ± 1)×10^{−12} cm^{3}s^{−1} at 230K.

For krypton, we can only make an estimation:

k_{BC}^{Kr} = (4)×10^{−12} cm^{3}s^{−1}.

It is clear that the collisional coupling process induced by the rare gases are not well established. Different authors give different order of magnitudes. The uncertainty on the rate constants is therefore as important as for that of xenon. The vibrational excitation seems to play a role that is still not well defined. Direct measurements for k_{BC}^{Rg} and k_{CB}^{Rg} are not available. From the first estimations, the phenomena seem important in the kinetics of gaseous mixtures.

===== Vibrational relaxation =====
XeCl_{*} is more often synthesized with strong vibrational excitation and can reach vibration quantum numbers as high as v=100. This induces some vibrational relaxation that is formed by binary collision with an atom of a rare gas.

Only a single measurement for xenon and level v=2 has been published.

XeCl(B; v = 2) + Xe → XeCl(B; v’ = 0.1) + Xe rate constant of k_{v}

where k_{v} = (2 ± 1)×10^{−10} cm^{3}s^{−1}.

Most of the known results are related to buffer gases. Yet, only Dreiling and Sester completed measurements. The vibrational relaxation can be written as:

XeCl_{*}(v) + Rg → XeCl_{*}(v’) + Rg (19)

The orders of magnitude of k_{v}^{Rg} are summarized in Table 30. k_{v}^{Rg} increases with the vibrational level of XeCl_{*} and heavier rare gases, Rg. Values of k_{v}^{Rg} are assumed to be the same for states B and C.

Table 30 : Vibrational relaxation rate constants in cm^{3}s^{−1} induced by binary collisions with an atom of a buffer gas, Rg.
| v | He | Ne | Ar | Kr |
|---|---|---|---|---|
| 0–30 | (0.15 to 1.1) × 10^{−11} | (0.5 to 2.9) × 10^{−11} | (1.0 to 6.0) × 10^{−11} | (0.6 to 2.7) × 10^{−11} |
| 30–70 | (1.1 to 2.5) × 10^{−11} | (2.9 to 6.2) × 10^{−11} | (6.0 to 12) × 10^{−11} | (2.7 to 5.5) × 10^{−11} |
| 70–130 | (2.5 to 4.4) × 10^{−11} | (6.2 to 9.5) × 10^{−11} | (20 to 34) × 10^{−11} | (5.5 to 7.3) × 10^{−11} |

For helium and krypton, no comparison is available.

For neon, only the reaction with first two vibrational levels of B have been documented:

XeCl(B; v = 1) + Ne → XeCl(B ; v = 0) + Ne with rate constant of k_{v}^{Ne}=(0.3 to 0.5)×10^{−11} cm^{3}s^{−1}.

For argon, the values of k_{v}^{Ar} has been determined for v=33, 60 and 75. Their values, respectively, are (17 ± 5)×10^{−11}; (31 ± 9)×10^{−11} and (43 ± 10)×10^{−11} cm^{−11}. Other authors placed the figure for k_{v}^{Ar} between (10 and 15)×10^{−11} agreeing on the order of magnitude.

==== Disappearance pathways of the exciplex molecule ====
The chemical kinetics due to collisional coupling of states B and C and vibrational relaxation are not well known. The few available results often disagree, although a general idea of the situation is possible. For high vibrational levels, coupling overrides the vibrational relaxation while the contrary is true for the lowest levels, even if a rare gas is involved.

The various destructive processes of XeCl(B), differ in importance. A mixture optimized for lasers is used. Neon is favored over argon because the latter strongly absorbs via the Ar^{+}_{2} ion at 308 nm. Therefore, a ternary mixture (Ne/Xe/HCl) is used. The total pressure is fixed at 3 atm, the respective partial pressures is 2268.6 torr, 10 torr and 1.4 torr. The rate constants are the average values of the most reliable estimates.

The results are summarized in Table 31. For reaction (19), only the lowest vibrational levels are accounted. The lower frequency of disappearance limit is 0.40 ns^{−1}. This process induces the highest destruction, indicating that XeCl(B) synthesized with high vibrational excitation is quickly relaxed by binary collision with neon and (probably) also by xenon. This suggests that other processes are really noticeable only after XeCl(B) is on the v=0 level, which is why reaction (17) uses the value of k _{BC} ^{Do} relative to a low v. Once the relaxation is complete other processes take over. Depopulation by spontaneous emission is very important as well as reactions (11) and (17). These two processes lack refined measurements and determinations overall. The role of the xenon coupling is not better known but has less influence than the destruction by binary collision with HCl. Other better known processes are negligible. In particular all termolecular reactions are negligible.

Table 31 : Frequency of destruction of states B in ns^{−1}.
| Processes | Radiative pathway | 6 | 7 | 8 | 9 | 11 | 12 | 13 | 15 | 17 | 19 |
|---|---|---|---|---|---|---|---|---|---|---|---|
| Frequency | 0.099 | 0.036 | 0.001 | 0.0001 | 0.0008 | 0.24 | 0.0006 | 0.0074 | 0.027 | 0.064 | 0.40 |
| Percentage | 11% | 4% | < 1% | < 1% | < 1% | 27% | < 1% | 1% | 3% | 7% | 46% |
| Percentage after vibrational relaxation | 21% | 8% | < 1% | < 1% | < 1% | 50% | < 1% | 2% | 6% | 13% | |

== The Xe_{2}Cl exciplex molecule ==
Generally, Rg_{2}X molecules are less stable than RgX. Xe_{2}Cl is of double interest. It can cause perturbations in laser XeCl performance because it absorbs well at 308 nm and enables the development of another type of laser based on an Xe_{2}Cl emission.

=== The Xe_{2}Cl molecule ===
Initial studies on the Xe_{2}Cl molecule found:

- Its most stable configuration in the excited state has a triangular geometry C_{2v}.
- The Xe_{2}Cl_{*} excited states are complexes formed from the association of a molecular ion of Xe^{+}_{2} and an atomic ion of Cl^{−}.
- The observed emission of the molecule is broad; the corresponding transitions result in a very repulsive ground state.

The potential curves calculated by Huestis et al. from the DIM (Diatomics In Molecules) method are presented in Figure 15.

The three lowest states are covalent and repulsive. They are correlated to XeCl(X or A) and to an atom of xenon at the ground state. The experimental value of the energy at state 1^{2}Γ is 0.273 eV. It is compatible with these potential curves. The following three states are ionic. The bound state 4^{2}Γ is correlated to XeCl(B) + Xe; the following, 5^{2}Γ, a repulsive state, is correlated to XeCl(C) + Xe.

Last and George made a determination of the potential curves using another method, the DIIS (Diatomics In Ionic Systems) method without considering spin-orbital coupling. They found, like Huestis et al. that the 4^{2}Γ state is the lowest ionic state. At the bottom of the well, this state has the configuration of an isosceles triangle, such that the distance between the equilibrium positions of Xe and Cl is 3.23 Å. According to Adams and Chabalowski the Xe–Cl distance is 3.39 Å.

Initially, the potential curves of the different states were plotted by maintaining a constant and equal Xe-Xe distance at 3.25 Å (figure 16). Last and George discovered nine states (three covalent and six ionic). The potential curves of the antisymmetric states 4^{2}Γ_{π} and 6^{2}Γ_{π} are almost coincident with the potential curves of the symmetric states 5^{2}Γ and 6^{2}Γ. The 3^{2}Γ and 7^{2}Γ states highlighted by Huestin et al. are absent since the spin-orbital coupling were not taken into account. Inversely, three states, (2^{2}Γ_{π}, 4^{2}Γ_{π} and 6^{2}Γ_{π}) with the π symmetry, were not included in their diagrams.

A second study kept the separation of Xe-Cl at 3.23 Å (figure 17).

* In 4^{2}Γ_{π} state, the molecule with isosceles triangle configuration such as the Xe-Cl and Xe-Xe distances are respectively 3.13 and 4.23 Å. The state is 0.8 eV above the 4^{2}Γ state. * At the ground state, 1^{2}Γ forms a Van der Waals complex. It has a bond-dissociation energy of 0.075eV and a dissymmetric triangular configuration. The Xe–Cl distances are 3.23 and 4.06 Å and the Xe–Cl–Xe angle is 74.4°. * The second excited state 2^{2}Γ is also a Van der Waals complex. It has a symmetrical geometry and an Xe–Cl distance of 3.99 Å with an Xe–Cl–Xe angle of 68.4°. Its dissociation energy is 0.055 eV.

Another way of describing Xe–Cl–Xe finds the stable state to be linear and symmetric. At the ground state, the Xe-Cl distance should be 3.24 Å and the dissociation energy 0.076 eV. An excited state could exist with a geometric distance of Xe-Cl of 3.06 Å. This state, which is not shown in Figures 16 and 17, would possess an energy higher than 0.72 eV to that of the 4^{2}Γ state. The bonding would be ionic.

Only an experiment conducted at the solid state can be compared to these theoretical results. The special state studied was the 4^{2}Γ state. The isosceles triangle structure of this state was confirmed. Three quantities can be compared with theoretical predictions. The Xe-Xe distance is measured at 3.17 Å and that of Xe-Cl at 3 Å. The agreement in values is best for the energy at the bottom of the well that was evaluated at 3.15 eV. The fundamental vibrational frequencies for Xe–Xe, is ω_{x} = 123 cm^{−1} and for Xe–Cl, ω_{c} = 180 cm^{−1}.

=== Synthetic pathways ===
Three principal pathways of Xe_{2}Cl_{*} synthesis are energetically possible through collisions and two others through photodissociation:

Xe^{*}_{2}(A^{1}Σ) + Cl_{2} → Xe_{2}Cl_{*} + Cl (20)

Xe_{*} + Xe + Rg → Xe_{2}Cl_{*} + Rg (21)

Xe_{2}^{+} + Cl^{−} + Rg → Xe_{2}Cl_{*} + Rg (22)

XeCl_{*}(X) + Xe + hν → Xe_{2}Cl_{*} (23)

Xe + Cl + Xe + hν → Xe_{2}Cl_{*} (24)

where Rg is a rare gas, probably xenon or a buffer gas.

The authors disagree on the relative importance of these synthetic processes. The processes depend on experimental conditions.

==== Through harpoon reactions ====
Reaction (20) is a very energetic harpoon reaction. It involves Xe^{*}_{2} excited state. According to Bruce et al., this is the dominant synthetic pathway. Other authors though do not share this view since they believe that this reaction is weak, or indeed negligible. Its rate constant has not yet been measured.

==== The photoassociative pathway ====
Reactions (23) and (24) were only recently discovered.

==== The ionic pathway ====
According to a theoretical computation, the rate of recombination α’ of the Xe^{+}_{2} and Cl^{−} ions when Rg = Xe (reaction (22)) was, at the first instance, estimated as 1×10^{–7} cm^{3}s^{−1}. The same authors later revised this value downward as: α’ = 5×10^{–8} cm^{3}s^{−1}. This result was confirmed experimentally. According to computations, this reaction could become important at high pressures at which Xe_{2}Cl_{*} becomes the principal reaction product, to the detriment of XeCl_{*} (reaction (4)).

==== The ternary reactions ====
The synthesis of Xe_{2}Cl_{*} is principally through pathway (21). According to a recent study, the reaction can be interpreted as the result of two successive reactions, the second reaction corresponding to a vibrational relaxation through collision using Rg:

XeCl(B,C) + Xe ↔ Xe_{2}Cl_{*(v)}

Xe_{2}Cl_{*(v)} + Rg → Xe_{2}Cl_{*} + Rg

The starting vibrational levels of Xe_{2}Cl_{*(v)} are above the limit of dissociation of the state in XeCl_{*} + Xe.

In contrast, Yu et al. believe that the formation of Xe_{2}Cl_{*} is through a triatomic complex, RgXeCl^{*}, mainly :

XeCl_{*} + Rg → RgXeCl_{*} where Rg≠Xe

RgXeCl_{*} + Xe → Xe_{2}Cl_{*} Rg

These reactions have been observed in only argon and krypton.

The second reaction is one of displacement. Another reaction is competitive to it when xenon is replaced by krypton. This quenching process should have a rate constant higher than 1×10^{−13} cm^{3}s^{−1}.

The lifetime of the RgXeCl_{*} complex is not well known. It is estimated at 200 ns for KrXeCl and 40 ns for NeXeCl. This interval in time is sufficient for the second collision to have a chance of being produced.

The rate constants have been measured as summarized in table 32. If Rg≠Xe, only two direct measurements have been carried out. The last is only an evaluation.

Table 32 : Rate constants in cm^{6}s^{−1} of the reaction (21).
| Ref | He | Ne | Ar | Kr |
|---|---|---|---|---|
| | | | (1.5 ± 0.5) × 10^{−31} | |
| | (3.1 ± 1.3) × 10^{−31} | (6.0 ± 1.6) × 10^{−31} | (9.4 ± 2.4) × 10^{−31} | (14 ± 2) × 10^{−31} |
| | | (1.5) × 10^{−31} | | |

As for xenon, notice that the totality of the k_{DX} constants of table 20 could be taken as those of the fifth column of table 32 since k_{DX} could be merged with reaction (21).

=== Paths of disappearance ===
==== The radiative pathway ====
===== Emission spectra =====
Theoretical studies show that the allowed transitions are (figure 15) :

4^{2}Γ → 1^{2}Γ (A)

4^{2}Γ → 2^{2}Γ (B)

4^{2}Γ → 3^{2}Γ (C)

The starting states are always the same and the corresponding wavelengths, λ_{Th}, are indicated in Table 33. They can be compared to experimental values, λ_{Obs}.

Table 33 : Characteristics of Xe_{2}Cl_{*} emissions.
| Transition | Experiment: λ_{Obs} (nm) | Theoretical estimates: λ_{Th} (nm) | Theoretical estimates: relative importance | Theoretical estimates: transition moment (D) |
|---|---|---|---|---|
| (A) | 450 | 495 | Dominant | 2.45 |
| (B) | 490 | 514 | Important | 0.1 |
| (C) | | 541 | 100 times weaker | |

Experimentally, Fajardo and Apkarian observed two transitions (A) and (B) in the spectral domain, even while there was a significant wavelength shift. In most cases, a very large continuum (approximately 80 nm) was observed covering the three emissions. The maximum positioning oscillated between 450 and 500 nm. An example of this sort of spectrum is given in Figure 11. On computation, the limits of short wavelength emissions were evaluated at 443 nm.

According to Last and George, the Xe–Cl–Xe linear molecule ought to have produced an emission approaching the ground state at 321 nm and the transition moment should be elevated to 3.9 D. As of 2014, however, no experiment confirms this prediction.

At the solid state, the Xe_{2}Cl_{*} emission shifts towards the red range and is centered around 570 nm. A corresponding result is observed in the liquid state. This phenomenon should be owed to a distortion of the potential curves arising from molecular interactions which are closest to themselves than at the gaseous state. A theoretical study attributes this to the polarization of the xenon matrix by Xe_{2}^{+}Cl^{−} and by Van der Waals forces.

Emission of Xe_{2}Cl_{*} trimer is only observed at high pressures of the rare gas (xenon or buffer gas) and fluorescence increases with the pressure of xenon. These results follow because the synthetic pathway of Xe_{2}Cl_{*} is similar to that of reaction (21). Considering the values of the rate constant of reactions of type (21), the reaction frequency does not deviate in a significant way even when the rare gas pressure is close to 200 torr. Reaction (22) only takes place under pressure of several atmospheres.

===== Lifetime of Xe_{2}Cl (4^{2}Γ) =====
The only state where Xe_{2}Cl is the original parent of a luminous emission is 4^{2}Γ). Several determinations of its lifetime obtained at the gaseous state are summarized in Table 34. The results vary and the uncertainties involved are important. The confidence interval obtained within a threshold of 5% lies between 240 and 253 ns. Of these, four values are not included. Given the strong absolute uncertainty, another measure has a common interval within the confidence interval.

Table 34 : Lifetime of Xe_{2}Cl(4^{2}Γ) experimentally obtained at the gaseous state, excepting for the reference given by Stevens and Krauss which is a theoretical determination.
| Lifetime (ns) | Reference |
|---|---|
| 300 ± 50 | |
| 185 ± 10 | |
| 260 | |
| 135^{+70}_{−60} | |
| 210 ± 25 | |
| 250 ± 25 | |
| 245 ± 10 | |
| 328 ± 20 | |
| 250 | |
| 330 | |
| 210 ± 20 | |
| 242 ± 10 | |

Measurements realized at the solid state provide values that are yet more dispersed such as is shown in Table 35.

Table 35 : Lifetime of Xe_{2}Cl(4^{2}Γ) observed at the solid state.
| Matrix | Lifetime (ns) | References |
|---|---|---|
| Ar | 460 | |
| Ne | 260 ± 15 | |
| Kr | 450 | |
| Xe | 663 | |
| Xe | 225 ± 10 | |

==== The collision pathway ====
===== The role of chlorine donors (RCl) =====
Beyond the radiative disexcitation, the Xe_{2}Cl (4^{2}Γ) state is destroyed by a double collision with RCl. In practical terms, every author agrees that double collision is the dominant destruction pathway of Xe_{2}Cl when collision is involved, whatever the chlorine donor. Therefore, Xe_{2}Cl_{*} emissions are only observed at weak concentrations of RCl. The values of the rate constants for reactions (24) are given in Table 36.

Xe_{2}Cl_{*} + RCl → Other products except Xe_{2}Cl (24)

Table 36 : Rate constants in cm^{3}s^{−1} of reactions (24) for various donors of chlorine, RCl.
| Reference | Cl_{2} | HCl | CCl_{4} |
|---|---|---|---|
| | (2.2 ± 0.2) × 10^{−10} | (4.3 ± 0.4) × 10^{−10} | (5.4 ± 0.5) × 10^{−10} |
| | | (6.1 ± 0.2) × 10^{−10} | |
| | | 2.6 × 10^{−10} | |
| | | 8 × 10^{−10} | |
| | | 6.1 × 10^{−10} | |
| | | 6 × 10^{−10} | |
| | (3.9 ± 0.4) × 10^{−10} | | |
| | (4.5 ± 0.4) × 10^{−10} | | |
| | (2.6 ± 0.3) × 10^{−10} | | |
| | (4 ± 1) × 10^{−10} | | |
| | (7 ± 1) × 10^{−10} | | |
| | (4.0 ± 1) × 10^{−10}-10 | | |
| | 1.8 × 10^{−10} | | |
| | | | (6 ± 1) × 10^{−10} |

There are only two determinations for CCl_{4} and these are coincident. For HCl, two values are statistically distant from others. Giving an explanation for this distance remains difficult. The confidence interval at a threshold of 5% is from 4 to 7×10^{−10} cm^{3}s^{−1}.

In the case of chlorine, Cl_{2}, only one half of measurements are statistically close. Even so, this closeness is difficult to explain. Its confidence interval at the threshold of 5% varies from 3.7 to 4.5×10^{−10} cm^{3}s^{−1}. The three chlorine donors appear to have a corresponding influence on the collisional destruction of Xe_{2}Cl_{*}.

To estimate the rate constant of the reaction:

Xe_{2}Cl_{*} + Cl → 2 Xe + 2 Cl

The value is 1×10^{−9} cm^{3}s^{−1}.

===== The role of rare gases =====
These are uniquely binary reactions:

Xe_{2}Cl_{*} + Rg → Other products except Xe_{2}Cl (25)

The disappearance of Xe_{2}Cl_{*} by collision on a xenon atom was observed by Grieneisen et al., the reaction constant was estimated at 6×10^{−15} cm^{3}s^{−1}. However, this reaction has not been demonstrated by other authors. The upper bound of the rate constant of reaction (25) is 1×10^{−17} cm^{3}s^{−1}, although other authors placed this limit at 4 to 7×10^{−14} cm^{3}s^{−1} or 5×10^{−13} cm^{3}s^{−1}. The value used by Kannari et al., 8×10^{−12} cm^{3}s^{−1}, has no basis.

For ternary mixtures, the role of the buffer gas is not well known.

For argon, (3 ± 1)×10^{−14} cm^{3}s^{−1} and (1.5 ± 0.4)×10^{−14} cm^{3}s^{−1} are available.

For helium, 5×10^{−13} cm^{3}s^{−1} and 3×10^{−14} cm^{3}s^{−1} are available.

===== The role of electrons and impurities =====
The rate of reactions of Xe_{2}Cl_{*} + e^{−} → 2 Xe + Cl + e^{−} (26) does not have consistent estimates. They are summarized in Table 37.

Table 37 : Rate constants of reaction (26) in cm^{3}s^{−1}.
| Rate constants | Reference |
|---|---|
| 2 × 10^{−7} | |
| 9 × 10^{−9} | |
| 2 × 10^{−8} | |
| 4 × 10^{−9} | |

The impurities have a lesser influence in the chemical decay of Xe_{2}Cl than XeCl^{*}. The bimolecular rate constants of disappearance of Im_{–}Xe_{2}Cl_{*} are an order of magnitude lower than the relative rate constants for binary collisions ImXeCl_{*}. Yet, for CO_{2} and nitric oxide, NO, the rate constants are of the same order of magnitude, about some 10^{−10} cm^{3}s^{−1}. Impurity levels, most often low, may influence the measurements. The reaction frequencies are negligible.

== See also ==
- Excimer lamp
- Absorption spectroscopy
- Collisional excitation
- Harpoon reactions
- Reaction rate
