= Excimer =

Excited dimeric molecule containing a noble gas

Excimer energy diagram

An excimer (originally short for excited dimer) is a short-lived polyatomic molecule formed from two species that do not form a stable molecule in the ground state. In this case, formation of molecules is possible only if such atom is in an electronic excited state. Heteronuclear molecules and molecules that have more than two species are also called exciplex molecules (originally short for excited complex). Excimers are often diatomic and are composed of two atoms or molecules that would not bond if both were in the ground state. The lifetime of an excimer is very short, on the order of nanoseconds.

== Formation and decay ==
Molecular orbitals

Under the molecular orbital formalism, a typical ground-state molecule has electrons in the lowest possible energy levels. According to the Pauli principle, at most two electrons can occupy a given orbital, and if an orbital contains two electrons they must be in opposite spin states. The highest occupied molecular orbital is called the HOMO and the lowest unoccupied molecular orbital is called the LUMO; the energy gap between these two states is known as the HOMO–LUMO gap. If the molecule absorbs light whose energy is equal to this gap, an electron in the HOMO may be excited to the LUMO. This is called the molecule's excited state.

Excimers are only formed when one of the dimer components is in the excited state. When the excimer returns to the ground state, its components dissociate and often repel each other. The wavelength of an excimer's emission is longer (smaller energy) than that of the excited monomer's emission. An excimer can thus be measured by fluorescent emissions.

Because excimer formation is dependent on a bimolecular interaction, it is promoted by high monomer density. Low-density conditions produce excited monomers that decay to the ground state before they interact with an unexcited monomer to form an excimer.

== Usage note ==
The term excimer (excited state dimer) is, strictly speaking, limited to cases in which a true dimer is formed; that is, both components of the dimer are the same molecule or atom. The term exciplex refers to the heterodimeric case; however, common usage expands excimer to cover this situation.

== Examples and use ==
Excimer lasers
Laser	Reagents	Emission peak
XeCl	Xe + Cl_{2}	308 nm
KrF	Kr + NF_{3}	248 nm
ArF	Ar + F_{2}	193 nm

Heterodimeric diatomic complexes involving a noble gas and a halide, such as xenon chloride, are common in the construction of excimer lasers, which are excimers' most common application. These lasers take advantage of the fact that excimer components have attractive interactions in the excited state and repulsive interactions in the ground state. Emission of excimer molecules is also used as a source of spontaneous ultraviolet light (excimer lamps).

The molecule pyrene is another canonical example of an excimer that has found applications in biophysics to evaluate the distance between biomolecules.

In organic chemistry, many reactions occur through an exciplex, for example, those of simple arene compounds with alkenes. The reactions of benzene and their products depicted are a [2+2]cycloaddition to the ortho product (A), a [2+3]cycloaddition to the meta product (B) and the [2+4]cycloaddition to the para product (C) with simple alkenes such as the isomers of 2-butene. In these reactions, it is the arene that is excited.

Arene photocycloadditions

As a general rule, the regioselectivity is in favor of the ortho adduct at the expense of the meta adduct when the amount of charge transfer taking place in the exciplex increases.

== Generation techniques ==
For a noble gas dimer or noble gas halide it takes a noble gas atom in an excited electronic state to form an excimer molecule. Sufficiently high energy (approximately 10 eV) is required to obtain a noble gas atom in the lowest excited electronic state, which provides the formation of an excimer molecule. The most convenient way to excite gases is by an electric discharge. That is why such excimer molecules are generated in a plasma (see excimer molecule formation) or through high energy electron beams.

== Fluorescence quenching ==
Exciplexes provide one of the three dynamic mechanisms by which fluorescence is quenched. A regular exciplex has some charge-transfer (CT) character, and in the extreme case there are distinct radical ions with unpaired electrons. If the unpaired electrons can spin-pair to form a covalent bond, then the covalent bonding interaction can lower the energy of the charge transfer state. Strong CT stabilisation has been shown to lead to a conical intersection of this exciplex state with the ground state in a balance of steric effects, electrostatic interactions, stacking interactions, and relative conformations that can determine the formation and accessibility of bonded exciplexes.

As an exception to the conventional radical ion pair model, this mode of covalent bond formation is of interest to photochemistry research, as well as the many biological fields using fluorescence spectroscopy techniques. Evidence for the bonded exciplex intermediate has been given in studies of steric and Coulombic effects on the quenching rate constants and from extensive density functional theory computations that show a curve crossing between the ground state and the low-energy bonded exciplex state.

== See also ==
- Excimer lamp – Ultraviolet source based on spontaneous emission of excimer molecules
- Excimer laser – Type of ultraviolet laser important in chip manufacturing and eye surgery
- Förster resonance energy transfer – Photochemical energy transfer mechanism
- Krypton fluoride laser – Type of excimer laser
- Noble gas compound – Chemical compound containing a noble gas element
