= GlobalFoundries =

Semiconductor foundry company

GlobalFoundries Inc.
- Type: Public
- Traded as: Nasdaq: GFS; Russell 1000 component
- ISIN: KYG393871085
- Industry: Semiconductors
- Founded: March 2, 2009; 17 years ago (as a spin-off of AMD)
- Headquarters: Malta, New York, U.S.
- Key people: Thomas Caulfield (chairman); Tim Breen (CEO)
- Services: Semiconductor manufacturer
- Revenue: ▲US$6.791 billion (2025)
- Operating income: ▲US$797 million (2025)
- Net income: ▲US$888 million (2025)
- Total assets: ▲US$17.141 billion (2025)
- Total equity: ▲US$11.983 billion (2025)
- Owner: Mubadala (82%)
- Number of employees: 14,000 (2025)
- Website: gf.com

GlobalFoundries Inc. is a multinational semiconductor technology development, design and contract manufacturing company domiciled in the Cayman Islands and headquartered in Malta, New York. Created by the divestiture of the manufacturing arm of AMD in March 2009, the company was privately owned by Mubadala Investment Company, a sovereign wealth fund of the United Arab Emirates, until an initial public offering (IPO) in October 2021. Mubadala remains the majority owner of the company with an 82% stake.

The company manufactures integrated circuits on wafers designed for markets such as smart mobile devices, data centers and communications infrastructure, automotive, aerospace and defense, and for consumer internet of things (IoT).

As of 2023, GlobalFoundries is the third-largest semiconductor foundry by revenue. It is the only one with operations in Singapore, the European Union, and the United States: one 200 mm and one 300 mm wafer fabrication plant in Singapore; one 300 mm plant in Dresden, Germany; one 200 mm plant in Essex Junction, Vermont (where it is the largest private employer) and one 300 mm plant in Malta, New York.

GlobalFoundries is a "Trusted Foundry" for the U.S. federal government and has similar designations in Singapore and Germany, including certified international Common Criteria standard (ISO 15408, CC Version 3.1).

On October 28, 2021, the company sold shares in an IPO on the Nasdaq stock exchange at US$47 each, at the higher end of its targeted price range, and raised about US$2.6 billion.

== History ==
On 7 October 2008, Advanced Micro Devices (AMD) announced it planned to go fabless and spin off its semiconductor manufacturing business into a new company temporarily called The Foundry Company. Mubadala announced its subsidiary Advanced Technology Investment Company (ATIC) agreed to pay $700 million to increase its stake in AMD's semiconductor manufacturing business to 55.6 percent (up from 8.1 percent). Mubadala would invest $314 million for 58 million new shares, increasing its stake in AMD to 19.3 percent, and $1.2 billion of AMD's debt would be transferred to The Foundry Company. On 8 December 2008, amendments were announced: AMD would own approximately 34.2 percent and ATIC would own approximately 65.8 percent of The Foundry Company.

On 4 March 2009, GlobalFoundries was officially announced. On 7 September 2009 ATIC announced it would acquire Chartered Semiconductor, based in Singapore, for S$2.5 billion (US$1.8 billion) and integrate Chartered Semiconductor into GlobalFoundries. On 13 January 2010 GlobalFoundries announced it had finalized the integration of Chartered Semiconductor.

On 4 March 2012 AMD announced they divested their final 14 percent stake in the company, which concluded AMD's multi-year plan to divest its manufacturing arm.

On 20 October 2014 IBM announced the sale of its microelectronics business to GlobalFoundries.

As of 2015 the firm owned ten fabrication plants. Fab 1 is in Dresden, Germany. Fabs 2 through 7 are in Singapore. Fabs 8 through 10 are in the northeast United States. These sites are supported by a global network of R&D, design enablement, and customer support in Singapore, China, Taiwan, Japan, India, the United States, Germany, and the United Kingdom. In February 2017, the company announced a new 300 Fab [Fab 11] in China for growing semiconductor market in China.

In 2016 GlobalFoundries licensed the 14 nm 14LPP FinFET process from Samsung Electronics. In 2018 GlobalFoundries developed the 12 nm 12LP node based on Samsung's 14 nm 14LPP process.

On 27 August 2018 GlobalFoundries announced it had cancelled their 7LP process due to a strategy shift to focus on specialized processes instead of leading edge performance.

On 29 January 2019 AMD announced an amended wafer supply agreement with GlobalFoundries. AMD now has full flexibility for wafer purchases from any foundry at 7 nm or beyond. AMD and GlobalFoundries agreed to commitments and pricing at 12 nm for 2019 through 2021.

On 20 May 2019 Marvell Technology Group announced it would acquire Avera Semi from GlobalFoundries for $650 million and potentially an additional $90 million. Avera Semi was GlobalFoundries' ASIC Solutions division, which had been a part of IBM's semiconductor manufacturing business. On 1 February 2019 GlobalFoundries announced the $236 million sale of its Fab 3E in Tampines, Singapore, to Vanguard International Semiconductor (VIS) as part of their plan to exit the MEMS business by 31 December 2019. On April 22, 2019, GlobalFoundries announced the $430 million sale of their Fab 10 in East Fishkill, New York, to ON Semiconductor. GlobalFoundries has received $100 million and was going to receive another $330 million at the end of 2022 when ON Semiconductor would gain full operational control. The 300mm fab is capable of 65 nm to 40 nm and was a part of IBM. On August 15, 2019, GlobalFoundries announced a multi-year supply agreement with Toppan Photomasks. The agreement included Toppan acquiring GlobalFoundries' Burlington photomask facility.

In February 2020 GlobalFoundries announced that its embedded magnetoresistive non-volatile memory (eMRAM) entered production which is the industry's first production ready eMRAM.

In May 2020 GlobalFoundries stated it was fully abandoning its plans of opening Fab 11 in Chengdu, China due to reported rivalry between the latter and the US. This happened three years after the manufacturer announced it would invest $10 billion to open the new fab; however, the fab was never brought online.

On 26 April 2021 GlobalFoundries announced that effective immediately, it was transferring its global headquarters from Santa Clara, California to its Malta, New York campus (home to Fab 8).

In August 2022 Google expanded its open-source chip design and manufacturing efforts by partnering with GlobalFoundries to develop an open-source process design kit (PDK) based on the foundry's 180 nm node. In October 31, Google announced they would sponsor no-cost OpenMPW (multi-project wafer) shuttle runs for it in the coming months.

GlobalFoundries was a gold sponsor for the Special Olympics Vermont Penguin Plunge which raised over $500,000 in 2022 to support Vermont athletes.

In February 2023 GlobalFoundries signed a deal to become the exclusive provider of US-produced semiconductor chips for General Motors amid an ongoing shift to electric vehicles in what was referred to as an "industry-first" deal. It would help General Motors reduce the amount of different chips needed in its vehicles. The companies planned for production in Malta, New York. The deal would not lead to new jobs right away but would rather ensure stability in the supply of chips. At the time of the announcement, GlobalFoundries CEO Thomas Caufield said the full effect of this increase in production would be seen in two to three years.

On September 21, 2023, the U.S. Department of Defense (DoD) awarded GlobalFoundries a 10-year contract for the supply of securely manufactured semiconductors for critical aerospace and defense applications. With an initial award of $17.3 million and an overall 10-year spending ceiling of $3.1 billion, this agreement ensures the DoD and its contractors have access to GF's U.S.-made semiconductors. This contract also provides access to GF's design ecosystem, IP libraries, and advanced technologies.

In November 2024, GF paid a US$500,000 fine to the United States Department of Commerce for unlicensed shipments of US$17 million in product to a sanctioned entity related to Semiconductor Manufacturing International Corporation.

=== Expansion and Investment under the CHIPS and Science Act ===
In February 2024, the U.S. Department of Commerce announced a $1.5 billion planned investment in GF as part of the CHIPS and Science Act, making GF the recipient of the first major award from the funding initiative. This investment is set to bolster GF's efforts to expand and introduce new manufacturing capacities, thereby enhancing the production of semiconductors for automotive, IoT, aerospace, defense, and other vital sectors.

In May 2026, GlobalFoundries will receive $375 million to establish a “secure, domestic quantum foundry for leading architectures and multiple modalities."

=== GlobalFoundries v. TSMC et al (2019) ===
On August 26, 2019, GlobalFoundries filed patent infringement lawsuits against TSMC and some of TSMC's customers in the US and Germany. GlobalFoundries claims TSMC's 7 nm, 10 nm, 12 nm, 16 nm, and 28 nm nodes have infringed on 16 of its patents. Lawsuits were filed in the U.S. International Trade Commission, the U.S. Federal District Courts in the Districts of Delaware, the Western District of Texas, the Regional Courts of Düsseldorf, and Mannheim in Germany. GlobalFoundries has named 20 defendants: Apple, Broadcom, MediaTek, Nvidia, Qualcomm, Xilinx, Arista, ASUS, BLU, Cisco, Google, Hisense, Lenovo, Motorola, TCL, OnePlus, Avnet/EBV, Digi-Key and Mouser. On August 27, TSMC announced it was reviewing the complaints filed, but are confident that the allegations are baseless and will vigorously defend its proprietary technology.

On 1 October 2019 TSMC filed patent infringement lawsuits against GlobalFoundries in the US, Germany and Singapore. TSMC claimed GlobalFoundries' 12 nm, 14 nm, 22 nm, 28 nm and 40 nm nodes have infringed on 25 of its patents.

On 29 October 2019 TSMC and GlobalFoundries announced a resolution to the dispute. The companies agreed to a new life-of-patents cross-license for all of their existing semiconductor patents as well as new patents to be filed by the companies in the next ten years.

=== Dresden expansion (2025) ===
On October 28, 2025, GlobalFoundries announced plans to invest €1.1 billion in the expansion of its Dresden, Germany manufacturing site (Project SPRINT), with the goal of exceeding one million wafers per year by the end of 2028. The investment, supported by the German federal government and the State of Saxony, is part of the framework of the European Chips Act and aims to strengthen Europe's semiconductor supply-chain resilience.

=== List of GlobalFoundries CEOs ===
- Doug Grose (2009–2011)
- Ajit Manocha (2011–2014)
- Sanjay Jha (2014–2018)
- Thomas Caulfield (2018–2025)
- Tim Breen (2025–present)

== Fabrication foundries in operation ==
Name	Wafer	Location	Geo Location	Process
Fab 1	300 mm	Dresden, Germany	51.125°N 13.716°E	55, 45, 40, 32, 28, 22 nm, 12 nm
Fab 2	200 mm	Woodlands, Singapore	1.436°N 103.766°E	600–350 nm
Fab 3/5	200 mm	Woodlands, Singapore	1.436°N 103.766°E	350–180 nm
Fab 3E	200 mm	Tampines, Singapore (2019: sold to VIS)	1.371°N 103.929°E	180 nm
Fab 6	200 mm	Woodlands, Singapore (converted to 300 mm and merged into Fab 7)	1.436°N 103.766°E	180–110 nm
Fab 7	300 mm	Woodlands, Singapore	1.436°N 103.766°E	130–40 nm
Fab 8	300 mm	Luther Forest Technology Campus, Saratoga County, New York, United States	42.970°N 73.756°W	65-12 nm
Fab 9	200 mm	Essex Junction, Vermont, United States	44.48°N 73.10°W	350–90 nm

=== 300 mm fabrication facilities ===
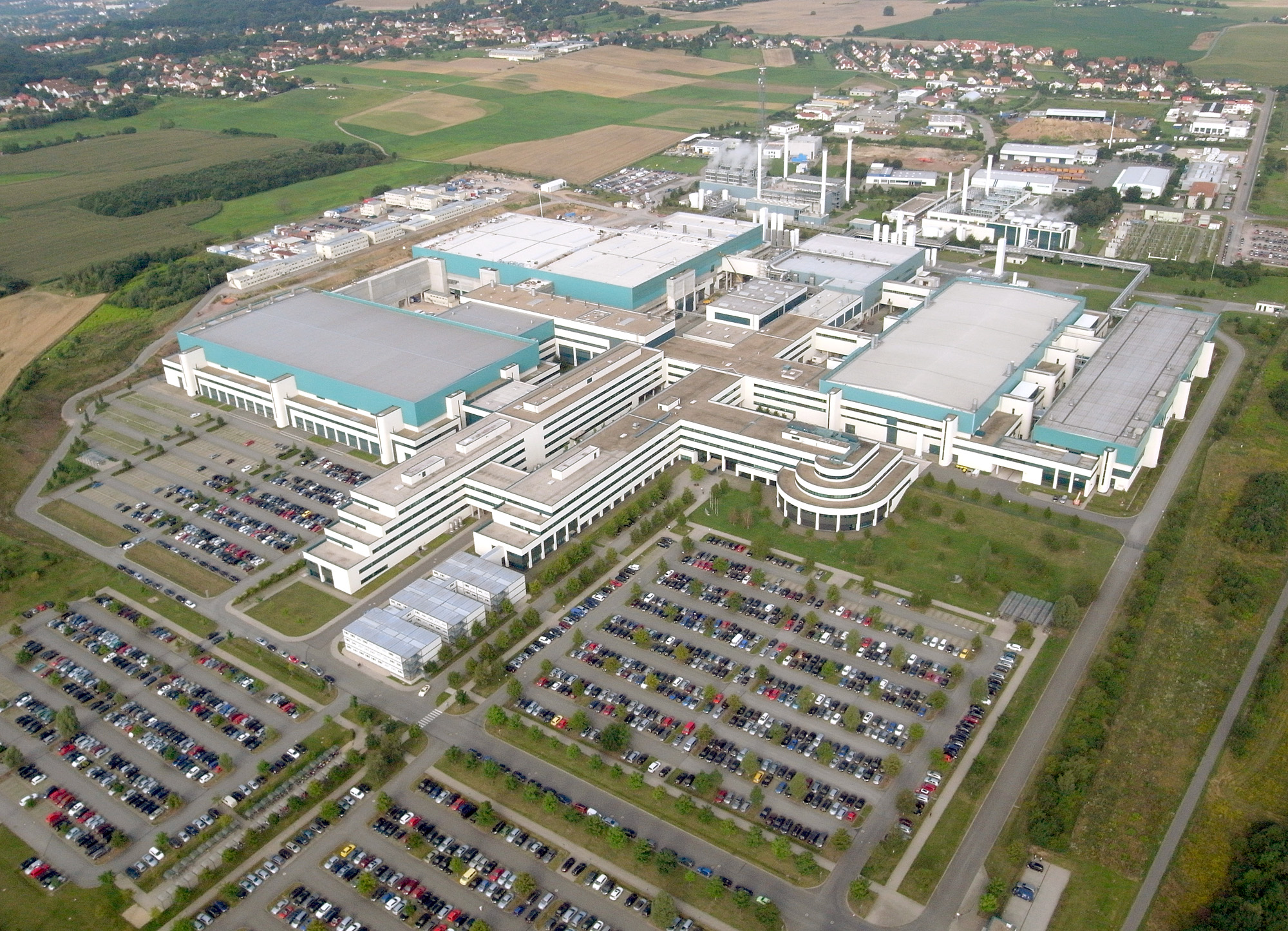
GlobalFoundries Fab 1 in Dresden

==== Fab 1 ====
Fab 1, located in Dresden, Germany, is a 364,512 m^{2} plant which was transferred to GlobalFoundries on its inception: Fab 36 and Fab 38 were renamed Module 1 and Module 2, respectively. Each module can produce 25,000 300 mm diameter wafers per month.

Module 1 is a 300 mm wafer production facility. It is capable of manufacturing wafers at 40 nm, 28 nm BULK and 22 nm FDSOI. Module 2 was originally named "(AMD) Fab 30" and was a 200 mm fab brought online in 1999 and later produced up to 30,000 Wafer Outs Per Month. It has now been converted into a 300 mm wafer fab. Together with other clean room extensions like the Annex they have a maximum full capacity of 80,000 of 300 mm wafers/month (180,000 200 mm wafers/month equivalent), using technologies of 45 nm and below.

In September 2016, GlobalFoundries announced Fab 1 would be refit to produce 12 nm fully depleted silicon on insulator (FDSOI) products. The company expected customer's products would begin to tape out in the first half of 2019.

In 2020 the Dresden plant had a capacity of 300,000 wafers per year.

In 2023, it was announced that GlobalFoundries plans to invest $8 billion in its Dresden facility, doubling the capacity of its largest production site.

==== Fab 7 ====
Fab 7, located in Woodlands, Singapore, is an operational 300 mm Fab, originally owned by Chartered Semiconductor. It produces wafers at 130 nm to 40 nm on bulk CMOS and SOI processes. It has a maximum full capacity of 50,000 300 mm wafers/month (112,500 200 mm wafers/month equivalent).

4/15/2021 Fab 7's target capacity will be expanded to 70–80kpcs/M.

==== Fab 8 ====
Fab 8, located in Luther Forest Technology Campus, Saratoga County, New York, United States is a 300 mm fab. This fabrication plant was constructed by GF as a green field fab for advanced technologies. It is capable of manufacturing 14 nm node technology. The plant's construction began in July 2009 and the company started mass production in 2012. It has a maximum manufacturing capacity of 60,000 of 300 mm wafers/month, or the equivalent of over 135,000 of 200 mm wafers/month. In September 2016, GlobalFoundries announced it would make a multibillion-dollar investment to refit Fab 8 to produce 7 nm FinFET parts starting in the second half of 2018. The process was planned to initially use deep ultraviolet lithography, and eventually transition to extreme ultraviolet lithography.

However, in August 2018, GlobalFoundries made the decision to suspend 7 nm development and planned production, citing the unaffordable costs to outfit Fab 8 for 7 nm production. GlobalFoundries held open the possibility of resuming 7 nm operations in the future if additional resources could be secured. From this decision GlobalFoundries executed a shift in company strategy to focus more effort on FD-SOI manufacturing and R&D. Fab 8 serves a crucial function to supply AMD (Advanced Micro Devices) with CPU wafers for its Zen-based Ryzen, Threadripper and Epyc lines of CPUs. The original Zen and the Zen+ CPUs are of a monolithic design which were produced at GlobalFoundries facilities in Malta, NY. Going forward, AMD pursued a chiplet design with the Zen 2 series. Zen 2 desktop and server processors consist of a 14/12 nm manufactured I/O die surrounded by a number of 7 nm core dies. When GlobalFoundries announced the suspension of 7 nm operations, AMD executed a shift in plans transferring production of the 7 nm core dies to TSMC (Taiwan Semiconductor Manufacturing Company). There was speculation in some quarters as to where manufacture of the core dies would take place. In AMD's 2018 fourth quarter financial conference call which took place on January 29, 2019, AMD CEO Lisa Su announced the WSA (Wafer Supply Agreement) governing production and acquisition by AMD from GlobalFoundries had been amended for the seventh time. The amendment stated AMD would continue to procure 12 nm node and above from GlobalFoundries while giving AMD latitude to purchase 7 nm node manufactured wafers from any source free from paying any royalties. The agreement will run through 2024 and ensures that GlobalFoundries will have work for its Malta plant for that time period. Pricing commitments for wafers run through 2021 when it is likely the WSA will be amended again.

==== Accreditation as a Trusted Supplier ====
In May 2023, the U.S. Department of Defense (DoD), through the Defense Microelectronics Activity (DMEA), Trusted Access Program Office (TAPO), accredited GlobalFoundries' advanced manufacturing facility in Malta, New York, as a Category 1A Trusted Supplier. This accreditation enables GlobalFoundries to manufacture secure semiconductors for a wide range of critical aerospace and defense applications.

==== Fab 10 ====
Fab 10, located in East Fishkill, New York, United States, was previously known as IBM Building 323. It became part of GlobalFoundries operations with the acquisition of IBM Microelectronics. It currently manufactures technology down to the 14 nm node. In April 2019, it was announced that this fab has been sold to ON Semiconductor for $430m. The facility will be transferred over within three years.

On February 10, 2023, Onsemi successfully completed its acquisition of GF's 300 mm East Fishkill, New York site and fabrication facility.

=== 200 mm fabrication facilities ===
All 200 mm fabs except Fab 9 are located in Singapore, and originally owned by Chartered Semiconductor.

==== Fab 2 ====
Fab 2, located in Woodlands, Singapore. This fab is capable of manufacturing wafers at 600 to 350 nm for use in selected automotive IC products, High Voltage power management IC and Mixed-signal products.

==== Fab 3/5 ====
Fab 3/5, located in Woodlands, Singapore. This fab is capable of manufacturing wafers at 350 to 180 nm for use in high voltage IC's for small panel display drivers and mobile power management modules.

==== Fab 3E ====
Fab 3E, located in Tampines, Singapore. This fab produces 180 nm wafers for use in selected automotive IC products, High Voltage power management IC and Mixed-Signal products with embedded non-volatile memory technology.

In January 2019 GlobalFoundries announced that it had agreed to sell its Fab 3E in Singapore to Vanguard International Semiconductor Corporation with transfer of ownership set to be completed on December 31, 2019.

==== Fab 6 ====
Fab 6 located in Woodlands, Singapore, is a copper fabrication facility that is capable of manufacturing integrated CMOS and RFCMOS products for applications such as Wi-Fi & Bluetooth devices at 180 to 110 nm processes. The facility was later converted to 300mm and merged with Fab 7, a facility for manufacturing products based on 300mm wafer technology.

==== Fab 9 ====
Fab 9, located in the city of Essex Junction, Vermont, United States, near Vermont's largest city of Burlington, became part of GlobalFoundries operations with the acquisition of IBM Microelectronics. The fab manufactures technologies down to the 90 nm node and is the largest private employer within the state of Vermont. The site also hosted a captive mask shop, with development efforts down to the 7 nanometer node, until it was sold to Toppan in 2019.

== Mergers and acquisitions ==
=== Chartered Semiconductor ===
The majority investor of GlobalFoundries, Abu Dhabi's Advanced Technology Investment Co., announced on September 6, 2009, that it has agreed to acquire Singapore-based Chartered Semiconductor Manufacturing Co. Ltd., for a total of $3.9 billion, with Chartered's operations being folded into GlobalFoundries.

Chartered Semiconductor is a member of the Common Platform, IBM's semiconductor technology alliance. GlobalFoundries is a JDA partner of Common Platform Technology Alliance.

=== IBM Microelectronics ===
In October 2014, GlobalFoundries received US$1.5 billion from IBM to accept taking over IBM Microelectronics, including a 200 mm fab (now Fab 9) in Essex Junction, Vermont, and a 300 mm fab (now Fab 10) in East Fishkill, New York. As part of the agreement, GlobalFoundries was to have been the sole provider of IBM's server processor chips for the next 10 years. The deal closed on July 1, 2015. IBM-India employees who moved over to GlobalFoundries as part of the acquisition are now part of its Bangalore office.

In April 2019 ON Semiconductor and GlobalFoundries announced a $430 million agreement to transfer ownership of GlobalFoundries 300mm Fab 10 in East Fishkill, New York, to ON Semiconductor.

In 2021 and 2023, GlobalFoundries sued IBM over intellectual property disputes involving IBM's agreements with Intel and Rapidus.

=== Tagore Technology ===
On July 1, 2024, GlobalFoundries acquired Tagore Technology's proprietary and production-proven Gallium Nitride (GaN) IP portfolio. The acquisition expanded GF's power-management solutions roadmap and broadened its access to market-leading GaN IP for high-efficiency power-delivery systems in AI datacenters, automotive and IoT applications.

=== MIPS Technologies ===
In 2025, GlobalFoundries acquired MIPS Technologies, a developer of RISC-V and AI processor IP. The acquisition expanded GF's compute-IP portfolio and supported integration of low-power processor architectures into its differentiated technologies.

=== GlobalFoundries-TSMC GaN Technology License ===
On November 10, 2025, GlobalFoundries entered into a technology-licensing agreement with TSMC covering 650 V and 80 V GaN technology. The deal supports GF's development of a U.S.-based GaN power portfolio targeting high-efficiency devices for data-center, industrial, and automotive applications.

=== Advanced Micro Foundry ===
On November 17, 2025, GlobalFoundries announced its acquisition of Advanced Micro Foundry (AMF), a silicon-photonics foundry based in Singapore. The acquisition strengthened GF's capabilities in silicon photonics and optical-interconnect manufacturing for data-center, telecom, sensing, and LiDAR markets. The acquisition established the company as the largest silicon photonics pure-play foundry by revenue.

=== InfiniLink ===
On November 25, 2025, GlobalFoundries acquired InfiniLink, a Cairo-based semiconductor startup focused on high-speed optical-connectivity solutions. The acquisition is intended to accelerate GF's development of pluggable transceivers, co-packaged optics (CPO), and optical components for AI-datacenter and high-performance networking infrastructure.

=== Synopsys’ ARC Processor IP Solutions business ===
In January 2026, it was announced that GlobalFoundries had agreed to acquire Synopsys’ ARC Processor IP Solutions business. The transaction, expected to close in the second half of 2026 subject to regulatory approvals, includes multiple processor and AI-related IP product lines and associated engineering teams, which are to be integrated into GlobalFoundries' subsidiary, MIPS. Financial terms were not disclosed.

== Process technologies ==
GlobalFoundries' 22 nm FD-SOI process is second-sourced from STMicroelectronics. STMicroelectronics signed a sourcing and licensing agreement with Samsung for the same technology later.

GlobalFoundries' 14 nm 14LPP FinFET process is second-sourced from Samsung Electronics. GlobalFoundries' 12 nm FinFET nodes are based on Samsung's 14 nm 14LPP process.

Node name	ITRS node (nm)	Date introduced	Wafer size (mm)	Lithography (wavelength)	Transistor type	Gate pitch (nm)	Metal 1 pitch (nm)	SRAM bit density (μm^{2})
4S	600	1993	200 Bulk	–	Planar	–	–	–
CS-24	500	1993	200 Bulk	–	Planar	–	–	–
5L	500	1993	200 Bulk	–	Planar	–	–	–
5S	500	1994	200 Bulk	–	Planar	–	–	–
SiGe 5HP	500	2001	200	–	Planar	–	–	–
SiGe 5AM	500	2001	200	–	Planar	–	–	–
SiGe 5DM	500	2002	200	–	Planar	–	–	–
SiGe 5PA	500	2002	200	–	Planar	–	–	–
5X	450	1994	200 Bulk	–	Planar	–	–	–
CS-34	350	1995	200 Bulk	–	Planar	–	–	–
SiGe 5HPE	350	2001	200	–	Planar	–	–	–
SiGe 5PAe	350	2007	200	–	Planar	–	–	–
SiGe 5PAx	350	2016	200	–	Planar	–	–	–
SiGe 1KW5PAe	350	?	200	–	Planar	–	–	–
SiGe 1K5PAx	350	2016	200	–	Planar	–	–	–
6S	290	1996	200 Bulk	–	Planar	–	–	–
CS-44	250	1998	200 Bulk	Dry 248nm DUV	Planar	–	–	–
6S2	250	1997	200 Bulk	Dry 248nm DUV	Planar	–	–	–
6SF	250	?	200 Bulk	Dry 248nm DUV	Planar	–	–	–
6X	250	1997	200 Bulk	–	Planar	–	–	–
6RF	250	2001	200 Bulk	Dry 248nm DUV	Planar	–	–	–
250SOI	250	1999	200 SOI	Dry 248nm DUV	Planar	–	–	–
SiGe 6HP	250	2000	200	Dry 248nm DUV	Planar	–	–	–
SiGe 6DM	250	?	200	Dry 248nm DUV	Planar	–	–	–
SiGe 6WL	250	2007	200	Dry 248nm DUV	Planar	–	–	–
7S	220	1998	200 Bulk	Dry 248nm DUV	Planar	–	–	–
220SOI	220	1999	200 SOI	Dry 248nm DUV	Planar	–	–	–
7HV	180	2010	200	Dry 248nm DUV	Planar	–	–	–
180 BCDLite	180	2011	200	Dry 248nm DUV	Planar	–	–	–
180 UHV	180	2017	200	Dry 248nm DUV	Planar	–	–	–
7SF	180	1999	200 Bulk	Dry 248nm DUV	Planar	–	–	–
7TG	180	?	200 Bulk	Dry 248nm DUV	Planar	–	–	–
7RF	180	2003	200 Bulk	Dry 248nm DUV	Planar	–	–	–
8S	180	2000	200 SOI	Dry 248nm DUV	Planar	–	–	–
7RF SOI	180	2007	200 RF-SOI, 300 RF-SOI	Dry 248nm DUV	Planar	–	–	–
7SW RF SOI	180	2014	200 RF-SOI	Dry 248nm DUV	Planar	–	–	–
SiGe 7WL	180	2003	200	Dry 248nm DUV	Planar	–	–	–
SiGe 7HP	180	2003	200	Dry 248nm DUV	Planar	–	–	–
130 BCDLite	130	2014	300	Dry 248nm DUV	Planar	–	–	–
130 BCD	130	?	300	Dry 248nm DUV	Planar	–	–	–
8SF	130	2000	200 Bulk	Dry 248nm DUV	Planar	–	–	–
8SFG	130	2003	200 Bulk, 300 Bulk	Dry 248nm DUV	Planar	–	–	–
8RF	130	2003	200 Bulk, 300 Bulk	Dry 248nm DUV	Planar	–	–	–
130G	130	?	300 Bulk	Dry 248nm DUV	Planar	–	–	–
130LP	130	?	300 Bulk	Dry 248nm DUV	Planar	–	–	–
130LP/EE	130	?	300 Bulk	Dry 248nm DUV	Planar	–	–	–
110TS	130	?	300 Bulk	Dry 248nm DUV	Planar	–	–	–
9S	130	2000	200 SOI, 300 SOI	Dry 248nm DUV	Planar	–	–	–
130RFSOI	130	2015	300 RF-SOI	Dry 248nm DUV	Planar	–	–	–
8SW RF SOI	130	2017	300 RF-SOI	Dry 248nm DUV	Planar	–	–	–
SiGe 8WL	130	2005	200	Dry 248nm DUV	Planar	–	–	–
SiGe 8HP	130	2005	200, 300	Dry 248nm DUV	Planar	–	–	–
SiGe 8XP	130	2016	200	Dry 248nm DUV	Planar	–	–	–
9SF	90	2004	300 Bulk	Dry 193nm DUV	Planar	–	–	–
9LP	90	2005	300 Bulk	Dry 193nm DUV	Planar	–	–	–
9RF	90	?	300 Bulk	Dry 193nm DUV	Planar	–	–	–
10S	90	2002	300 SOI	Dry 193nm DUV	Planar	–	–	–
90RFSOI	90	2004	300 RF-SOI	Dry 193nm DUV	Planar	–	–	–
9SW	90	2023	300 RF-SOI	Dry 193nm DUV	Planar	–	–	–
90WG	90	2018	300 Bulk	Dry 193nm DUV	Planar	–	–	–
90WG+	90	?	300 Bulk	Dry 193nm DUV	Planar	–	–	–
SiGe 9HP	90	2014, 2018	200, 300	Dry 193nm DUV	Planar	–	–	–
10SF	65	?	300 Bulk	Dry 193nm DUV	Planar	–	–	–
10LP	65	?	300 Bulk	Dry 193nm DUV	Planar	–	–	–
65LPe	65	2009	300 Bulk	Dry 193nm DUV	Planar	–	–	–
65LPe-RF	65	2009	300 Bulk	Dry 193nm DUV	Planar	–	–	–
10RFe	65	?	300 Bulk	Dry 193nm DUV	Planar	–	–	–
11S	65	2006	300 SOI	Dry 193nm DUV	Planar	–	–	–
65RFSOI	65	2008	300 RF-SOI	Dry 193nm DUV	Planar	–	–	–
55 BCDLite	55	2018	300	Dry 193nm DUV	Planar	–	–	–
55HV	55	?	300	Dry 193nm DUV	Planar	–	–	–
55 ULP	55	?	300 Bulk	Dry 193nm DUV	Planar	–	–	–
55LPe	55	?	300 Bulk	Dry 193nm DUV	Planar	–	–	–
55LPe-RF	55	?	300 Bulk	Dry 193nm DUV	Planar	–	–	–
55LPx	55	?	300 Bulk	Dry 193nm DUV	Planar	–	–	–
55RF	55	?	300 Bulk	Dry 193nm DUV	Planar	–	–	–
45LP	45	?	300 Bulk	Wet 193nm DUV	Planar	–	–	–
12S	45	2007	300 SOI	Wet 193nm DUV	Planar	–	–	–
45RFSOI	45	2008	300 RF-SOI	Wet 193nm DUV	Planar	–	–	–
45RFE	45	2017	300 RF-SOI	Wet 193nm DUV	Planar	–	–	–
45CLO	45	2021	300	Wet 193nm DUV	Planar	–	–	–
40HV	40	?	300	Wet 193nm DUV	Planar	–	–	–
40LP	40	?	300 Bulk	Wet 193nm DUV	Planar	–	–	–
40LP-RF	40	?	300 Bulk	Wet 193nm DUV	Planar	–	–	–
13S	32	2009	300 SOI	Wet 193nm DUV	Planar	–	–	–
32LP	32	?	300 Bulk	Wet 193nm DUV	Planar	–	–	–
32HP	32	?	300 SOI	Wet 193nm DUV, double patterning	Planar	–	–	–
32SHP	32	2010	300 SOI	Wet 193nm DUV, double patterning	Planar	–	–	–
28HV	28	2019	300	Wet 193nm DUV	Planar	–	–	–
28LP	28	2009	300 Bulk	Wet 193nm DUV	Planar	–	–	–
28SLP	28	2010	300 Bulk	Wet 193nm DUV	Planar	–	–	–
28SLPe	28	2011	300 Bulk	Wet 193nm DUV	Planar	–	–	–
28HP	28	2010	300 Bulk	Wet 193nm DUV, double patterning	Planar	–	–	–
28HPP	28	2011	300 Bulk	Wet 193nm DUV, double patterning	Planar	–	–	–
28SHP	28	2013	300 Bulk	Wet 193nm DUV, double patterning	Planar	–	–	–
28SLP RF	28	2015	300 Bulk	Wet 193nm DUV	Planar	–	–	–
28FDSOI	28	2012	300 FD-SOI	Wet 193nm DUV	Planar	–	–	–
22FDX-ULP	22	2015	300 FD-SOI	Wet 193nm DUV	Planar	–	–	–
22FDX-UHP	22	2015	300 FD-SOI	Wet 193nm DUV	Planar	–	–	–
22FDX-ULL	22	2015	300 FD-SOI	Wet 193nm DUV	Planar	–	–	–
22FDX-RFA	22	2017	300 FD-SOI	Wet 193nm DUV	Planar	–	–	–
22FDX RF+	22	2021	300 FD-SOI	Wet 193nm DUV	Planar	–	–	–
14LPP	14	2015	300 Bulk	Wet 193nm DUV, double patterning	3D (FinFET)	78	64	0.09
14HP	14	2017	300 SOI	Wet 193nm DUV, double patterning	3D (FinFET)	–	–	–
12LP	12	2018	300 Bulk	Wet 193nm DUV, double patterning	3D (FinFET)	–	–	–
12LP+	12	2019	300 Bulk	Wet 193nm DUV, double patterning	3D (FinFET)	–	–	–

Number of processes currently listed here: 106

== See also ==
- List of semiconductor fabrication plants
- List of semiconductor companies by country
