= KRF =

KRF or KrF may refer to:

- Christian Democratic Party (Norway) (Kristelig Folkeparti, KrF)
- Kataeb Regulatory Forces, Lebanon, 1961-1977
- Korea Research Foundation, later National Research Foundation of Korea
- Krypton fluoride, KrF, a short-lived chemical compound
  - KrF laser
- Krf, the Serbo-Croatian name for Corfu, Greece
