= Argon fluoride laser =

Type of excimer laser

The argon-fluoride laser (ArF laser) is a particular type of excimer laser, which is sometimes (more correctly) called an exciplex laser. With its 193-nanometer wavelength, it is a deep ultraviolet laser, which is commonly used in the production of semiconductor integrated circuits, eye surgery, micromachining, and scientific research. "Excimer" is short for "excited dimer", while "exciplex" is short for "excited complex". An excimer laser typically uses a mixture of a noble gas (argon, krypton, or xenon) and a halogen gas (fluorine or chlorine), which under suitable conditions of electrical stimulation and high pressure, emits coherent stimulated radiation (laser light) in the ultraviolet range.

ArF (and KrF) excimer lasers are widely used in high-resolution photolithography machines, a critical technology for microelectronic chip manufacturing. Excimer laser lithography has enabled transistor feature sizes to shrink from 800 nanometers in 1990 to 7 nanometers in 2018. Extreme ultraviolet lithography machines have replaced ArF photolithography machines in some cases as they enable even smaller feature sizes while increasing productivity, as EUV machines can provide sufficient resolution in fewer steps.

The development of excimer laser lithography has been highlighted as one of the major milestones in the 50-year history of the laser.

== Theory ==
An argon-fluoride laser absorbs energy from a source, causing the argon gas to react with the fluorine gas producing argon monofluoride, a temporary complex, in an excited energy state:

2 Ar + F_{2} → 2 ArF

The complex can undergo spontaneous or stimulated emission, reducing its energy state to a metastable, but highly repulsive, ground state. The ground state complex quickly dissociates into unbound atoms:

2 ArF → 2 Ar + F_{2}

The result is an exciplex laser that radiates energy at 193 nm, which lies in the far ultraviolet portion of the spectrum, corresponding to an energy difference of 6.4 electron volts between the ground state and the excited state of the complex.

== Applications ==
=== Photolithography ===
The most widespread industrial application of ArF excimer lasers has been in deep-ultraviolet photolithography for the manufacturing of microelectronic devices (i.e., semiconductor integrated circuits or "chips"). From the early 1960s through the mid-1980s, Hg-Xe lamps were used for lithography at 436, 405, and 365 nm wavelengths. However, with the semiconductor industry's need for both finer resolution (for denser and faster chips) and higher production throughput (for lower costs), the lamp-based lithography tools were no longer able to meet the industry's requirements.

This challenge was overcome when, in a pioneering development in 1982, deep-UV excimer laser lithography was invented and demonstrated at IBM by K. Jain. With advances made in equipment technology in the following two decades, semiconductor electronic devices fabricated using excimer laser lithography reached $400 billion in annual production. As a result, excimer laser lithography (with both ArF and KrF lasers) has been a crucial factor in the continued advance of Moore's law.

=== Eye surgery ===
The UV light from an ArF laser is well absorbed by biological matter and organic compounds. Rather than burning or cutting material, the ArF laser dissociates the molecular bonds of the surface tissue, which disintegrates into the air in a tightly controlled manner through ablation rather than burning. Thus the ArF and other excimer lasers have the useful property that they can remove exceptionally fine layers of surface material with almost no heating or change to the remainder of the material, which is left intact. These properties make such lasers well-suited to the precision micromachining of organic materials (including certain polymers and plastics), and especially delicate surgeries such as eye surgery (e.g., LASIK, LASEK).

==== Surface micromachining ====
Recently, through the use of a novel diffractive diffuse system composed of two microlens arrays, surface micromachining by ArF laser on fused silica has been performed with submicrometer accuracy.

=== Fusion power ===
In 2021, the United States Naval Research Laboratory began work on an ArF for use in inertial confinement fusion, providing up to 16% energy efficiency.

LaserFusionX is developing a direct-drive fusion power prototype using argon-fluoride lasers. As of 2024, their focus was on building an implosion facility to design and test lasers capable of sufficiently rapid firing rates, using solid-state pulse power.

== Safety ==
The light emitted by the ArF laser is invisible to the human eye, so additional safety precautions are necessary when working with this laser to avoid stray beams. Gloves are needed to protect flesh from its potentially carcinogenic properties, and UV goggles are needed to protect the eyes.

== See also ==
- Excimer
- Excimer laser
- Excimer lamp
- Krypton fluoride laser
- Electrolaser
- Nike laser
- Photolithography
- Moore's law
