= Chartered Semiconductor Manufacturing =

Former semiconductor manufacturer

Coordinates: 1°26′16.7″N 103°46′1.03″E

Chartered Semiconductor Manufacturing, Inc.
- Company type: Subsidiary of GlobalFoundries
- Industry: Semiconductor integrated circuitry
- Founded: 1995
- Fate: Acquired by GlobalFoundries
- Headquarters: Woodlands, Singapore
- Key people: Ho Ching, Chairman, and Chia Song Hwee, CEO
- Revenue: ▲SGD1.435 billion (2006)
- Number of employees: 5,125

Chartered Semiconductor Manufacturing, Inc. (CSM), was a Singaporean semiconductor company.

== History ==
Chartered Semiconductor Manufacturing was founded in 1987, as a venture that included Singapore Technologies Engineering Ltd. The company signed a deal in 1994 with Toshiba for the use of their 0.5 micron process technology.

In 1996, Chartered began a partnership with the National University of Singapore and Nanyang Technological University to develop improvements for the fabrication processes of advanced semiconductors. In 1999, a new 3 year agreement was signed between the three of them for research, development and manufacturing of deepsubmicron semiconductors (DSM).

In 2000 ST Engineering (Singapore Technologies Semiconductors), a subsidiary of Temasek Holdings acquired Chartered.

In 2002, Chartered joined the ARM Foundry Program and in November of that year, it signed a joint development and manufacturing agreement with IBM. The agreement was extended in 2004, and again in 2005 to include the 45-nanometer (nm) bulk CMOS.

CSM was the world's third largest dedicated independent semiconductor foundry, with its headquarters and main operations located in the Woodlands Industrial Park, Kranji Singapore. The company was listed on the Singapore Exchange under the trading symbol of CHARTERED, as well as on NASDAQ (CHRT).

In September 2009, it was announced that Chartered Semiconductor was to be acquired by the main stockholder of GlobalFoundries, a joint venture between AMD and Advanced Technology Investment Company (ATIC), of Abu Dhabi, United Arab Emirates. The transaction was completed at the end of 2009 and cost of $1.8 billion USD.

By acquiring Chartered, ATIC expanded its investments and expertise in technology in the semiconductor industry.

== Fabrication facilities ==
Chartered provides comprehensive wafer fabrication services and technologies to semiconductor suppliers and systems companies. Chartered's customer base is primarily high-growth, technologically advanced companies operating in the communication, computer and consumer sectors. It does not provide design services and works from customers' designs to produce communications chips.

Besides its own fabs, Chartered operates joint venture facilities with other firms, it offers chip assembly and test services through sister firm STATS ChipPAC. Chartered owns 6 fabrication facilities, all of which are located in Singapore, including the newest, Chartered's first 300-mm facility which started commercial shipment in June 2005.

The other major semiconductor foundries include TSMC and UMC, Taiwanese-based companies, which are primarily Chartered's main competitors.

In 2006, AMD announced that it will manufacture CPUs with Chartered on a 65 nanometer process. It also has alliances with IBM, Infineon, Samsung and Agere Systems.
