= Nike laser =

Excimer laser

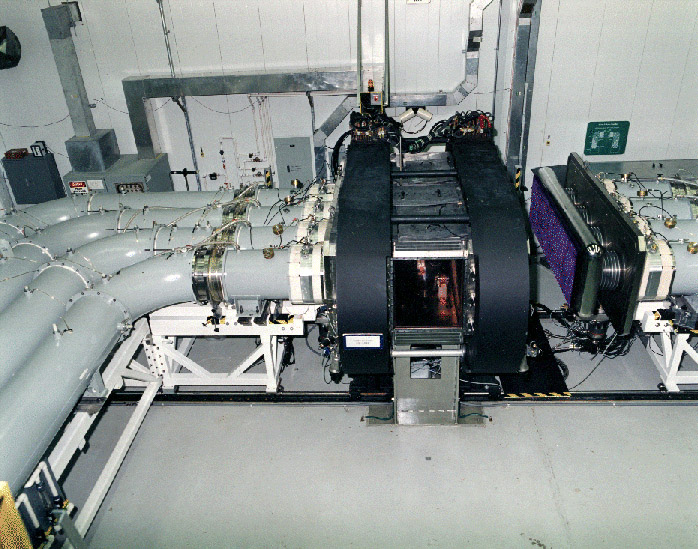
Final amplifier of the Nike laser where laser beam energy is increased from 150 J to ~5 kJ by passing through a krypton/fluorine/argon gas mixture excited by irradiation with two opposing 670,000 volt electron beams.

The Nike laser at the United States Naval Research Laboratory in Washington, DC is a 56-beam, 4–5 kJ per pulse electron beam pumped krypton fluoride excimer laser which operates in the ultraviolet at 248 nm with pulsewidths of a few nanoseconds. Nike was completed in the late 1980s and is used for investigations into inertial confinement fusion. By using a KrF laser with induced spatial incoherence (ISI) optical smoothing, the modulations in the laser focal profile (beam intensity anisotropy) are only 1% in one beam and < 0.3% with a 44-beam overlap. This feature is especially important for minimizing the seeding of Rayleigh-Taylor instabilities in the imploding fusion target capsule plasma.

== Background ==
The Electra Laser at NRL demonstrated over 90,000 shots in 10 hours; repetition rates needed for an IFE power plant.

In a gas-based laser, the entire gas molecule changes energy levels to release light. This is different from lasers that rely on electrons inside a given atom to change energy levels. The advantage of gas-based lasers are that with no solid medium, the hardware inside the beamline does not heat up. This allows excimer lasers to fire at high repetition rates. The other advantage is that this beam does not pass through a solid glass which distorts the beam, requiring smoothing once created. In 2013, the Electra laser was able to demonstrate over 90,000 shots in 10 hours using KRF gas.

Krypton fluoride lasers were studied more aggressively for fusion energy between the late 1980s into the middle of the 1990s; below is a list institutions that had research programs:

- Rutherford Appleton Laboratory
- Japan's Electrotechnical Laboratory
- China Institute for Atomic Energy
- Aurora KrF Laser at Los Alamos

== Design ==
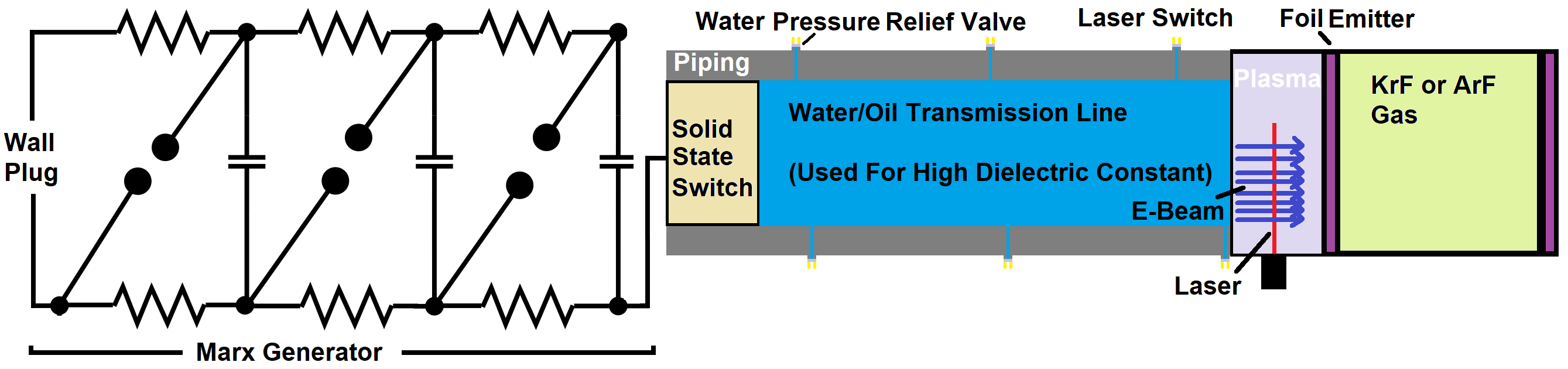

The NIKE laser system starts with a Marx generator that forms a large voltage pulse. This is applied to a solid state (or magnetic) switch that transfers that energy into a water-filled transmission line. This transmission line is a big metal pipe filled with water or oil that contains the current. The pipe includes pressure release valves in case there is a short/vaporization event inside the line. This current is passed to a plasma-based laser switch. A laser beam passes across the plasma switch, which induces streams of electrons to strike an emitter plate that pumps the energy into the KRF or ARF gas.

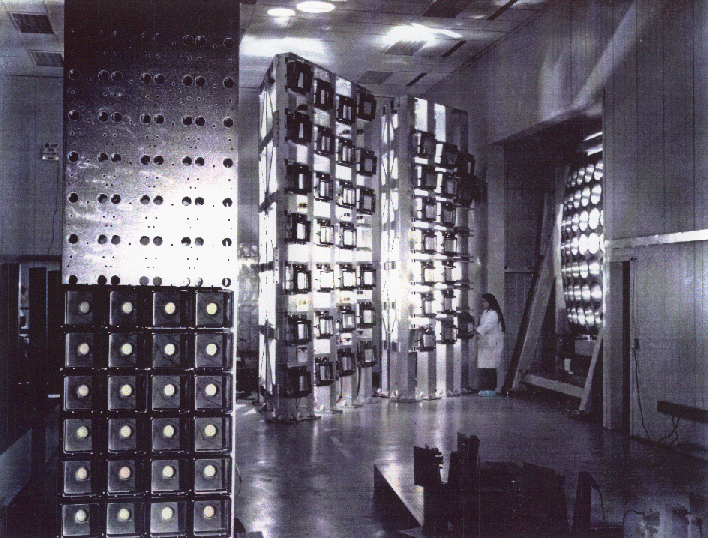
Nike laser final mirror array and lens array that direct the laser beams onto target.

== See also ==
- List of laser types
