= Mask shop =

A mask shop is a factory which manufactures photomasks for use in the semiconductor industry. There are two distinct types found in the trade. Captive mask shops are in-house operations owned by the biggest semiconductor corporations, while merchant mask shops make masks for most of the industry.

Merchant mask shops will produce photomasks for a variety of integrated device manufacturers (IDMs), foundries or optical device companies in addition to providing excess cavity work and re-pellicle for captive mask shops.

The company structure is similar to that of any medium-sized manufacture and has the following unique departments or mask makers:

- Sales Customer / customer services
- Front end data prep
- Facilities maintenance - plant & environment
- Engineering - equipment maintenance
- Engineering - process, inspection & metrology
- Quality assurance
- Shipping & dispatching

== Photomask market ==
The worldwide photomask production market was $3.1 billion in 2013. Almost half of market attributed to captive mask shops (in-house mask shops of major chipmakers).

== Infrastructure (technical and financial) ==
The costs of creating new mask shop for 180 nm processes were estimated in 2005 as $40 million, and for 130 nm - more than $100 million. In 2013 cost of new 28 nm mask shop was estimated at $110 – 140 million.

== Future ==
As technology shrinks, the cost to mask shops increase and the product turn around time grow longer as well.

== See also ==
- Computational lithography
- GDSII
