= Repulsive state =

Electronic state with no minimum in the potential energy

In quantum mechanics, a repulsive state is an electronic state of a molecule for which there is no minimum in the potential energy. This means that the state is unstable and unbound since the potential energy smoothly decreases with the interatomic distance and the atoms repel one another. In such a state there are no discrete vibrational energy levels; instead, these levels form a continuum. This should not be confused with an excited state, which is a metastable electronic state containing a minimum in the potential energy, and may be short or long-lived.

When a molecule is excited by means such as UV/VIS spectroscopy it can undergo a molecular electronic transition: if such a transition brings the molecule into a repulsive state, it will spontaneously dissociate. This condition is also known as predissociation since the chemical bond is broken at an energy which is lower than what might be expected. In electronic spectroscopy, this often appears as a strong, continuous feature in the absorption or emission spectrum, making repulsive states easy to detect.

For example, triatomic hydrogen has a repulsive ground state, which means it can only exist in an excited state: if it drops down to the ground state, it will immediately break up into one of the several possible dissociation products.
