= Krypton-fluoride laser =

Type of excimer laser

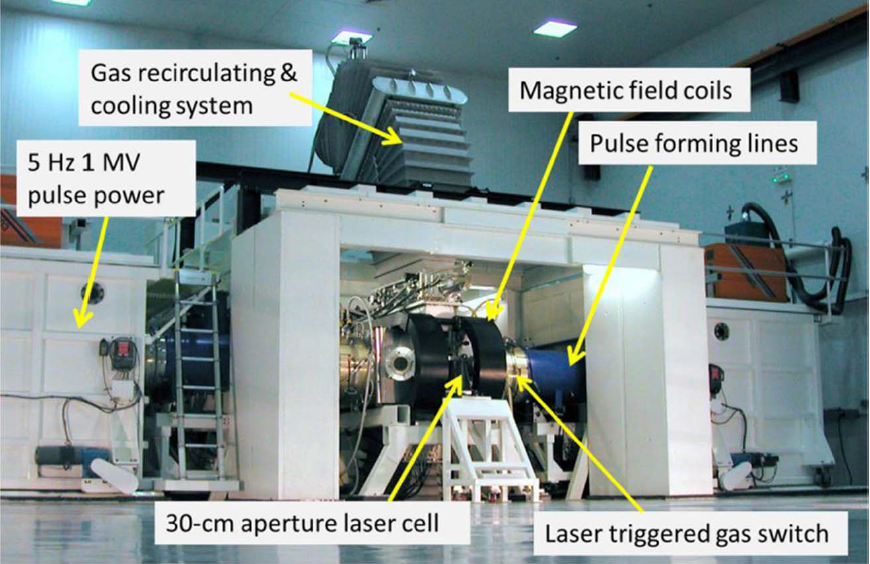
The electra laser at NRL is a KrF laser that demonstrated over 90,000 shots in 10 hours.

A krypton-fluoride laser (KrF laser) is a particular type of excimer laser, which is sometimes (more correctly) called an exciplex laser. With its 248 nanometer wavelength, it is a deep ultraviolet laser which is commonly used in the production of semiconductor integrated circuits, industrial micromachining, and scientific research. The term excimer is short for "excited dimer", while exciplex is short for "excited complex". An excimer laser typically contains a mixture of a noble gas, such as argon, krypton, or xenon, and a halogen gas such as fluorine or chlorine. Under suitably intense conditions of electromagnetic stimulation and pressure, the mixture emits a beam of coherent stimulated radiation as laser light in the ultraviolet range.

KrF and ArF excimer lasers are widely incorporated into high-resolution photolithography machines, one of the critical tools required for microelectronic chip manufacturing in nanometer dimensions. Excimer laser lithography has enabled transistor feature sizes to shrink from 800 nanometers in 1990 to 10 nanometers in 2016.

== Theory ==
A krypton-fluoride laser absorbs energy from a source, causing the krypton gas to react with the fluorine gas, producing the exciplex krypton fluoride, a temporary complex in an excited energy state:

2 Kr + F_{2} → 2 KrF

The complex can undergo spontaneous or stimulated emission, reducing its energy state to a metastable, but highly repulsive, ground state. The ground state complex quickly dissociates into unbound atoms:

2 KrF → 2 Kr + F_{2}

The result is an exciplex laser which radiates energy at 248 nm, near the ultraviolet portion of the spectrum, corresponding to the energy difference between the ground state and the excited state of the complex.

== Example Systems ==
There have been several of these lasers built for ICF experiments; examples include:

- Los Alamos built a KrF laser in 1985 to prove test firing of a beam with an energy level of 1×10^{4} Joules. This was part of the larger Aurora laser research effort that looked at CO_{2} lasers and other systems.
- Nike Laser. The Laser Plasma Branch of the Naval Research Laboratory completed a KrF laser called the Nike laser that can produce about 4.5×10^{3} J of UV energy output in a 4-nanosecond pulse. The NIKE laser was switched to an argon fluoride laser after 2013 to show the impact of going to shorter (193 nm) wavelengths.
- The Naval Research Laboratory built the Electra laser and Nike to prove both KrF and ArF lasers for ICF approaches. In 2013, Electra demonstrated 90,000 shots over 10 hours of operation.
- Rutherford Appleton Laboratory built the Sprite and Titania KrF lasers
- Japan's Electrotechnical Laboratory built the Ashura and Super Ashura KrF lasers.
- The China Institute for Atomic Energy had a laser before the mid-1990s.
- Livermore National Laboratory developed a KrF laser and amplifier known as a Raman Amplifier Pumped by Intensified Excimer Radiation (RAPIER) system.

== Applications ==
This laser has also been used to produce soft X-ray emission from a plasma, through irradiation by brief pulses of this laser light. Other important applications include manipulating various materials such as plastic, glass, crystal, composite materials, and living tissue. The light from this UV laser is strongly absorbed by lipids, nucleic acids, and proteins, making it useful for applications in medical therapy and surgery.

=== Microelectronics ===
The most widespread industrial application of KrF excimer lasers has been in deep-ultraviolet photolithography for the manufacturing of microelectronic devices (i.e., semiconductor integrated circuits or "chips"). From the early 1960s through the mid-1980s, Hg-Xe lamps had been used for lithography at 436, 405, and 365 nm wavelengths. However, with the semiconductor industry's need for both finer resolution (for denser and faster chips) and higher production throughput (for lower costs), the lamp-based lithography tools were no longer able to meet the industry's requirements. This challenge was overcome when, in a pioneering development in 1982, deep-UV excimer laser lithography was demonstrated at IBM by K. Jain. With phenomenal advances made in equipment and technology in the last two decades, modern semiconductor electronic devices fabricated using excimer laser lithography now total more than $400 billion in annual production. As a result, it is the semiconductor industry's view that excimer laser lithography (with both KrF and ArF lasers) has been a crucial factor in the predictive power of Moore's law. From an even broader scientific and technological perspective: since the invention of the laser in 1960, the development of excimer laser lithography has been highlighted as one of the major milestones in the 50-year history of the laser.

=== Fusion Research ===
The KrF laser has been used in nuclear fusion energy research since the 1980s. This laser offers several advantages:

- High repetition-rate shots—because the KrF is made using gas, it does not heat up, allowing for higher shot rates.
- Higher beam uniformity
- Relatively shorter wavelength for improved ICF compression.

== Safety ==
The light emitted by the KrF is invisible to the human eye, so additional safety precautions are necessary when working with this laser to avoid stray beams. Gloves are needed to protect the skin from the potentially carcinogenic properties of the UV beam, and UV goggles are needed to protect the eyes.

== See also ==
- Argon fluoride laser
- Nike laser
- Laser
- Krypton difluoride
- Krypton
- Fluorine
- Excimer laser
- Excimer lamp
- Photolithography
- Excimer
