= Carl Dorno =

German scientist

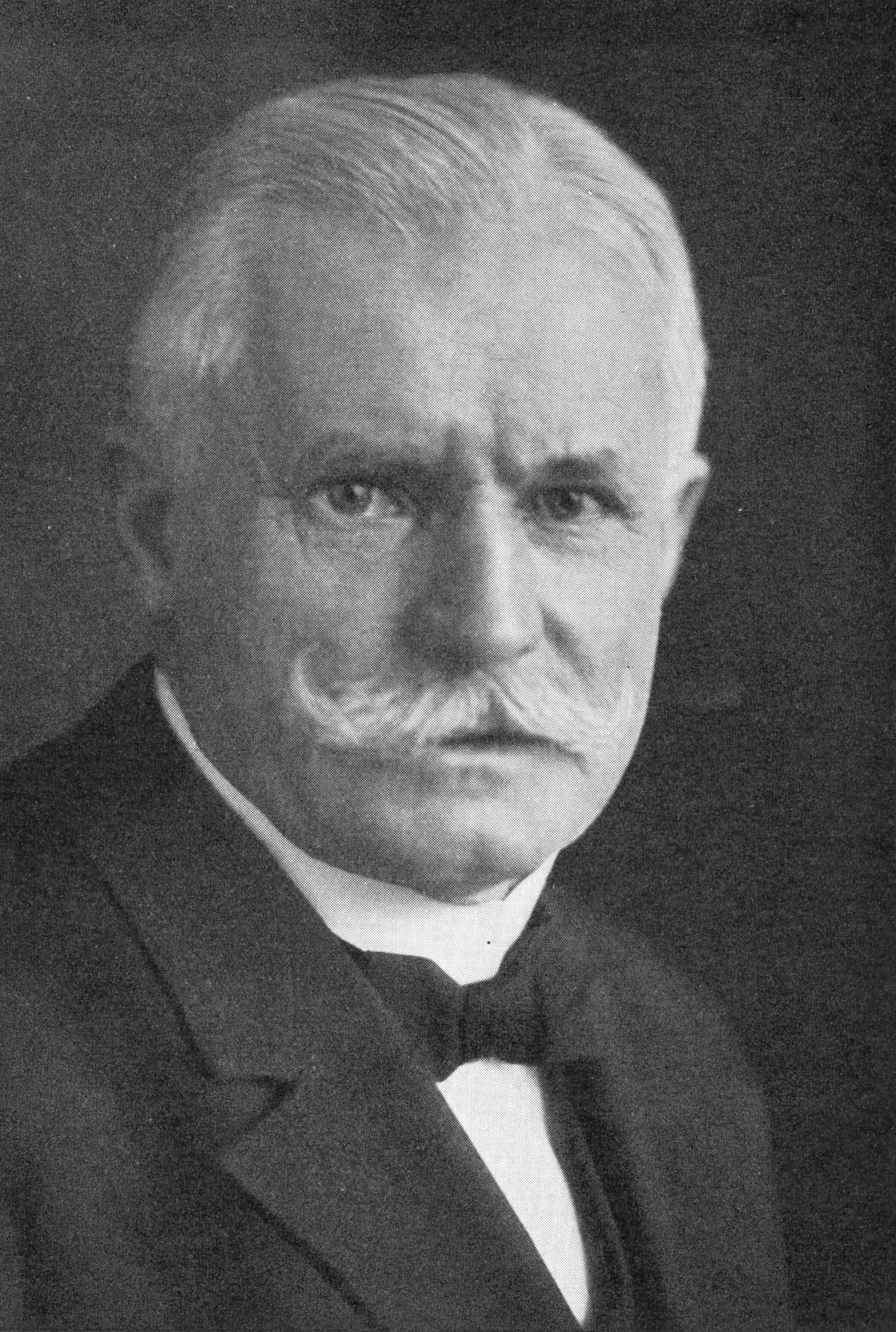
- Carl Dorno
- Born: August 3, 1865; Königsberg, Prussia
- Died: April 22, 1942 (aged 76)

Carl Wilhelm Max Dorno (3 August 1865 – 22 April 1942) was a Prussian-born businessman and amateur meteorologist who settled in Davos, Switzerland for the recovery of his only daughter from tuberculosis. Interested in the effect of climate on health, he established a pioneering observatory, now known as the Physikalisch-Meteorologisches Observatorium Davos (PMOD), for the study of solar radiation. He pioneered a field that has been termed as physiological, medical or biological climatology. Ultraviolet radiation was at the time also referred to as "Dorno radiation". The observatory continues to function as the PMOD World Radiation Centre.

== Life and work ==
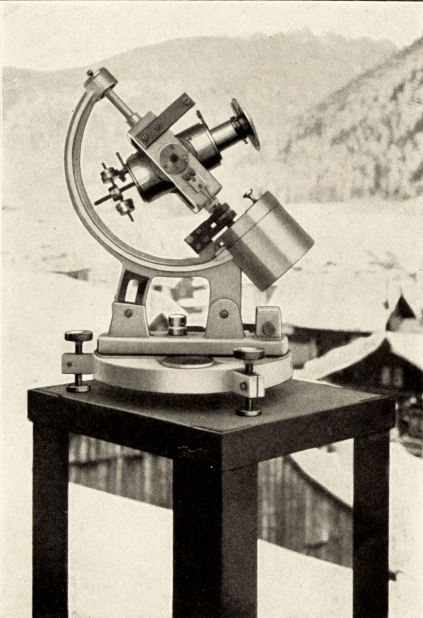
Pyrheliograph designed by Rudolf Thilenius and Dorno, 1922

Dorno was born in Königsberg (now Kaliningrad), son of a namesake businessman and Emma Lehnhard. He trained in business and took over his father's business in 1891 and married Erna Hundt the next year. He was however more interested in the natural sciences and began to study again at Königsberg University, obtaining a doctorate in 1904 for studies on bromomethacrylic and isobromomethacrylic acid. His only daughter then contracted tuberculosis and was advised to live in an alpine sanatorium, so he moved to Davos and there he began to examine why montane climate could be beneficial to health.

He set up a personal meteorological observatory, which came to be called the Physikalisch-Meteorologisches Observatorium Davos, spending 5000 Swiss francs for it in the first five years. He began to measure ultraviolet radiation which led him to seek cooperation from Carl Zeiss, Jena to develop measuring instrumentation. He developed other instruments including the gray wedge photometer or Davos pyrheliograph in collaboration with Rudolf Thilenius. In 1908 he was able to compare data from Davos with that of Kiel. In 1911 he published a study on radiation in the high mountains.

After the death of his daughter in 1912 he decided to continue the research he began. In 1914, he was able to note the effect of the Katmai eruption in 1912 in Alaska and its effect on sunshine in Europe for five months. The Swiss government took over his observatory and financed it while also allowing him to continue his research. Dorno published extensively in various journals and was able to hire scientists for research at his observatory. Dorno received the Leibniz Medal in 1919 and an honorary doctorate from the University of Basel in 1922. In 1924 he examined the effect of climate on birdsong. In 1925, the International Climate Congress was held in Davos under his leadership with a special emphasis on climate and human health. In 1926, he retired from the position of director of the observatory and poor vision made him give up work in the 1930s. The observatory was then merged to the Institut für Tuberkuloseforschung and it later became the Schweizerisches Forschungsinstitut für Hochgebirgsklima und Tuberkulose.
