= Ultraviolet communication in butterflies =

Butterflies, or members of the Papilionoidea superfamily, use two ultraviolet signals, UV reflectance or absorbance as a communication system. The ultraviolet region is the part of the electromagnetic spectrum between 10 nm and 400 nm in wavelength. Sensitivity to this region provides butterflies several benefits such as nectar guides for nectar, but it also provides a private communication channel unavailable to predators. With this secure line, butterflies are able to facilitate mating behavior and sex recognition.

== Reflection and absorption ==
The ultraviolet communication system has two roles, a sender and a receiver. Butterflies send ultraviolet signals using UV reflectance or UV absorption. The former is accomplished through the use of structural color, the reflection of certain frequencies of light via constructive interference. The production of this structural color in butterflies has been elucidated through the study of Eurema lisa by Helen Ghiradella. In this particular butterfly, a small yellow portion of the dorsal surface of the wings is directionally UV reflectant. In other words, the image from the UV reflection can only be seen at a distinct range of angles from the point of origin. Electron micrographs determined the scale structure which in turn elucidated the mechanism of UV reflection. UV reflecting scales are composed of raised longitudinal ridges and perpendicular cross ribs that connect the parallel running ridges, forming a grid. The ridges possess lamellae that run on top of and parallel to the ridges and microribs on its sides. The partial overlap of lamellae structures causes thin layer interference resulting in the reflection of light with a wavelength within the ultraviolet spectrum. The other ultraviolet signal in butterflies, absorbance, was determined to be governed by pigments called pterins. In wings containing this pigment, the wings are unable to reflect ultraviolet light as well as without the pigment because the pterins absorb the ultraviolet light. Thus, butterflies are able to reflect ultraviolet light as a result of the organization and composition of their wing scales resulting in thin layer constructive interference and can absorb ultraviolet through the action of pterin pigments.

== Perception ==
Butterflies receive ultraviolet signals by using a special opsin in the butterfly eye. The butterfly eye is similar to the average insect eye in that it is composed of numerous ommatidia. Each butterfly ommatidium contains nine photoreceptor cells with generally each cell using a single opsin. With a UV sensitive opsin the butterfly can see UV light and respond maximally to ultraviolet light at approximately 350 nm. Therefore, an opsin that responds to ultraviolet light is the mechanism behind ultraviolet light perception.

== Mating behavior ==
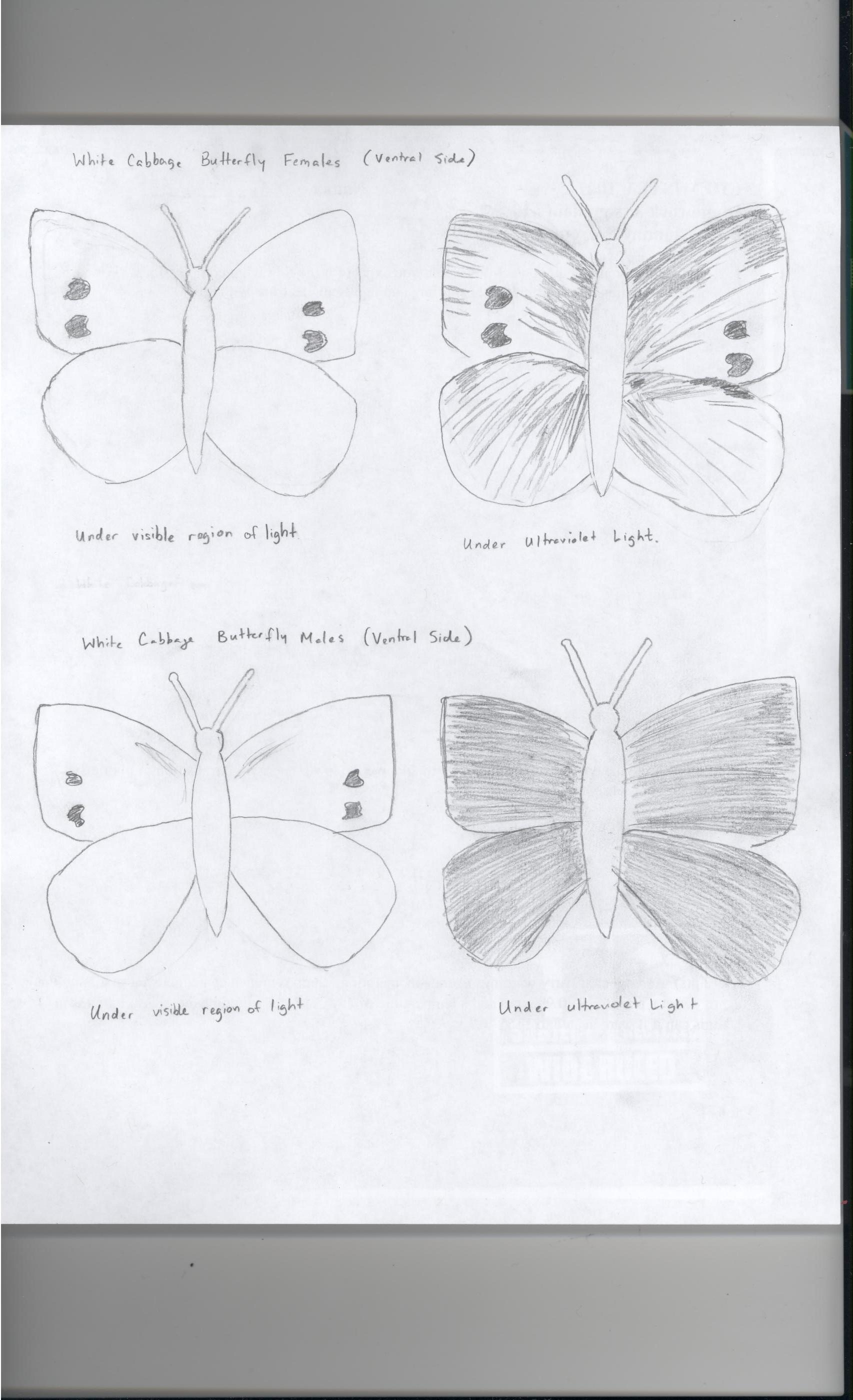
Drawings of the White Cabbage Butterfly representing the butterfly under UV light and the visible region of light.

White Cabbage Butterflies, Pieris rapae crucivora, use their private ultraviolet communication system to initiate mating behavior. In this species, ultraviolet reflection is sexually dimorphic with females exhibiting the ability to reflect ultraviolet light of 380 nm to 400 nm and males being less able to reflect UV. Males who perceive an ultraviolet reflection from a female initiate a courtship behavior that involves approaching the female and attempting to copulate. Females communicate their receptivity to males using their ultraviolet communication system. The ultraviolet reflection is thought to be concentrated to the ventral side of a female’s hind wing. Yoshiaki Obara determined this experimentally by comparing the number of approaches to different parts of butterfly wings. The results showed that the female’s ventral hind wing was the greatest releaser of male sexual behavior. Although ultraviolet reflectance releases the sexual behavior, the strongest reflection of UV light is not the strongest releaser for the behavior. As a result, male white cabbage butterflies must have a preference for a certain level of UV reflectance from females. Using a private ultraviolet communication system, female White Cabbage Butterflies signal their receptivity and initiate male mating behavior.

Ultraviolet light is not only an activator of male sexual behavior: Its absence may also stop an approaching male and his attempt to copulate. Female White Cabbage Butterflies are not always receptive to male White Cabbage Butterflies and to communicate this message, they assume the mate refusal posture. This behavior consists of opening the wings and straightening the abdomen. Opening of the wings in this manner exposes the dorsal side of the female wings which are known to be unable to reflect ultraviolet light. In effect, females are removing the ultraviolet signal that initiates male sexual behavior, resulting in the abrupt halt of male sexual behavior. Female White Cabbage Butterflies take advantage of the butterfly ultraviolet communication system to also reject males by removing an ultraviolet reflectance signal.

== Sex recognition ==
Some butterfly species use ultraviolet light as a method of signaling their sex. For example, in the species Eurema lisa, males possess the structural requirements necessary to reflect ultraviolet light discussed previously, but females lack the ultraviolet light reflecting ridges. In both sexes of this species, a flutter response, or the rapid opening and closing of the wings, is performed when a male approaches another butterfly; yet, males copulate with females who perform this behavior, while retreating from males who perform the flutter response. By showing that male and female wings are similar in appearance except for UV reflectance and an approaching male is exposed to ultraviolet reflection of a male's wings during a flutter response, as well as ruling out temporal differences in the flutter behavior as a cause for sex recognition, Ronald Rutowski concluded that ultraviolet light was being used as an indicator of the male sex. However, in some species this distinction is not seen at all times, and UV patterns may vary visually depending on the position of reflecting light. This can be seen in the common brimstone, where males will exhibit male or female patterns of iridescence with different positions, distances, and angles of light - this is known as the "gynandromorphic" effect.

The ultraviolet communication system employed by butterflies is also used as an indicator of male sex to other rival males in the butterfly Colias eurytheme. In this species, only males are able to reflect ultraviolet light off the dorsal side of their wings, while females cannot. The male sexual behavior is similar to most butterflies. The male hovers over a sitting female and dips to one of the female's sides and flutters. Then, if the female remains still, the male will land on her, her wings, or on the vegetation and attempt copulation. Copulation tends to last for an hour and often other males attempt to approach the mating pair. However, the male in midst of mating flashes his UV reflecting hind wings and approaching males are deterred. It was concluded that male Colias eurytheme uses ultraviolet light as a signal to repel other males. Thus, male Colias eurytheme butterflies use their private channel in the ultraviolet to signal their sex as well as deter other males from copulating with his mate.
