= Deuterium arc lamp =

Type of gas-discharge light source that emits ultraviolet light

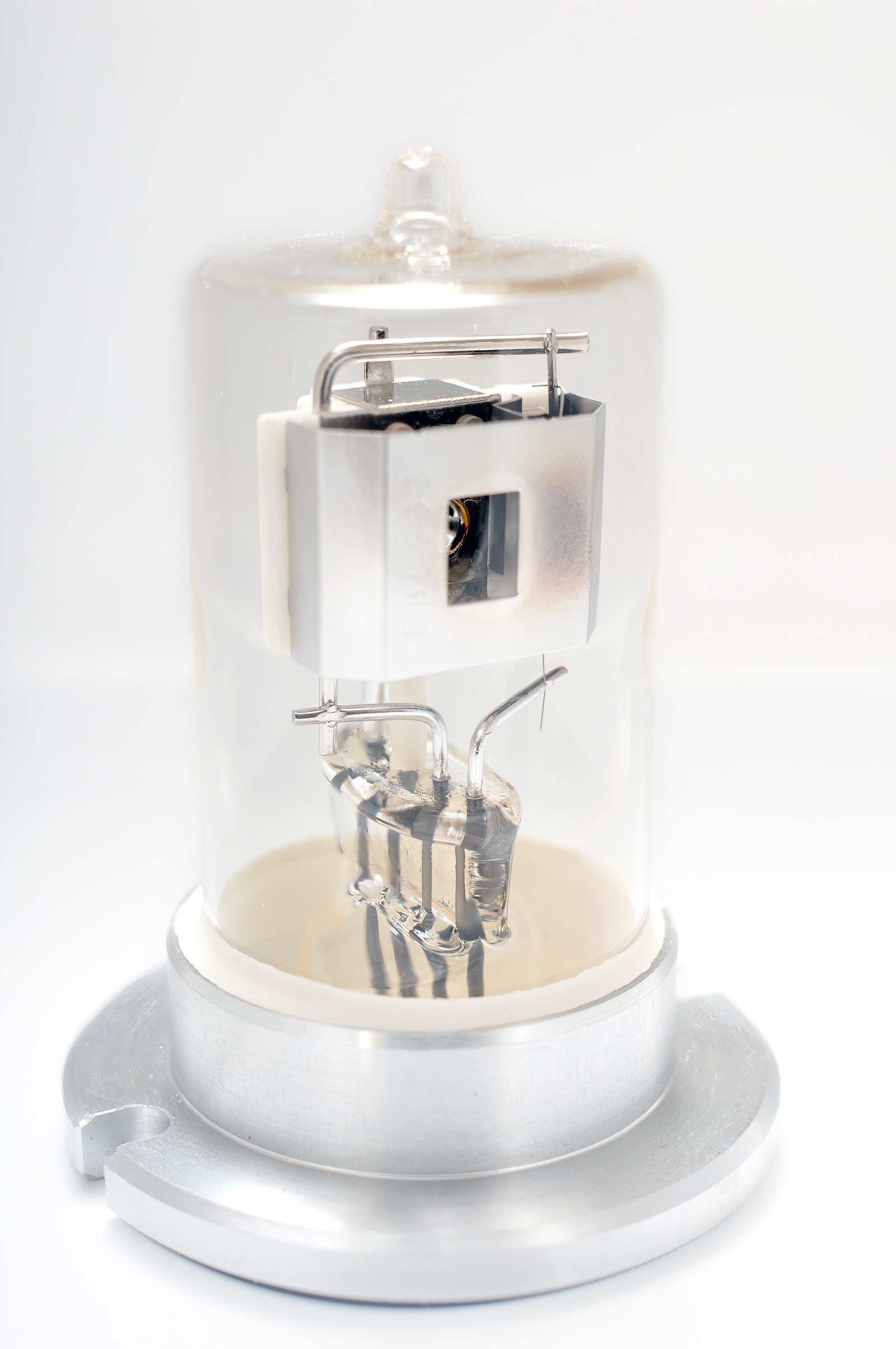
Deuterium arc lamp

A deuterium arc lamp (or simply deuterium lamp) is a low-pressure gas-discharge light source often used in spectroscopy when a continuous spectrum in the ultraviolet region is needed.

Plasma "arc" or discharge lamps using hydrogen are notable for their high output in the ultraviolet, with comparatively little output in the visible and infrared. This is similar to the situation in a hydrogen flame. Arc lamps made with ordinary light-hydrogen (hydrogen-1) provide a very similar UV spectrum to deuterium, and have been used in UV spectroscopes. However, lamps using deuterium have a longer life span and an emissivity (intensity) at the far end of their UV range which is three to five times that of an ordinary hydrogen arc bulb, at the same temperature. Deuterium arc lamps, therefore, despite being several times more expensive, are considered a superior light source to light-hydrogen arc lamps, for the shortwave UV range.

== Principle of operation ==
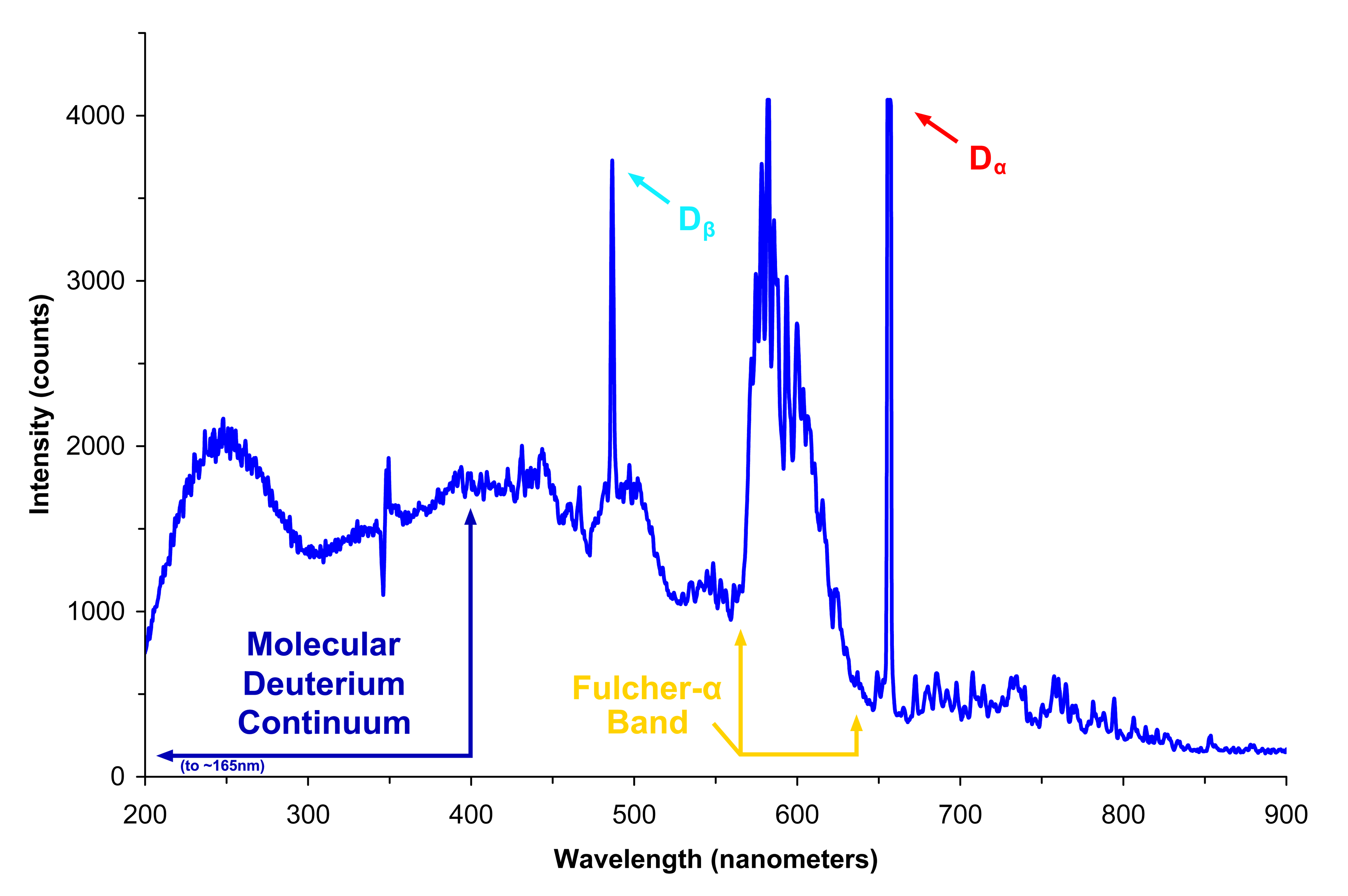
Emission spectrum of an ultraviolet deuterium arc lamp showing characteristic hydrogen Balmer lines (sharp peaks at 486 nm and 656 nm labeled D_{β} and D_{α} from left to right respectively), continuum emission in the ~160-400 nm region and Fulcher band emission between around 560 to 640 nm. The emission spectrum of deuterium differs slightly from that of protium (hydrogen-1) due to the influence of hyperfine interactions, though these effects alter the wavelength of the lines by mere fractions of a nanometer and are too fine to be discerned by the spectrometer used here. Deuterium is used rather than normal hydrogen because of its greater intensity of UV emission in the molecular band.

A deuterium lamp uses a tungsten filament and anode placed on opposite sides of a nickel box structure designed to produce the best output spectrum. Unlike an incandescent bulb, the filament is not the source of light in deuterium lamps. Instead, an arc is created from the filament to the anode, a similar process to arc lamps. Since the filament must be very hot before it can operate, it is heated for approximately 20 seconds before use. Since the discharge process produces its own heat, the heater is turned down after discharge begins. Although firing voltages are 300 to 500 volts, once the arc is created, voltages drop to around 100 to 200 volts.

The arc created excites the molecular deuterium contained within the bulb to a higher energy state. The deuterium then emits light as it transitions back to its initial state. This continuous cycle is the origin of the continuous UV radiation. This process is not the same as the process of decay of atomic excited states (atomic emission), where electrons are excited and then emit radiation. Instead, a molecular emission process, where radiative decay of excited states in molecular deuterium (D_{2} or ^{2}H_{2}), causes the effect.

The spectral line structure of deuterium does not differ noticeably from that of light hydrogen, but deuterium has a slightly stronger molecular bond (439.5 vs. 432 kJ/mol) and is less-well ionized at the temperature of the arc. This causes a larger population of molecules and a greater emissivity (light output) of UV in the molecular part of the spectrum that is furthest into the ultraviolet.

Since the lamp operates at high temperatures, normal glass housings cannot be used for a casing. They would also block UV radiation. Instead, a fused quartz, UV glass, or magnesium fluoride envelope is used depending on the specific function of the lamp.

The typical lifetime of a deuterium lamp is approximately 2,000 hours. Most manufacturers guarantee this lifetime, but newer lamps are consistently performing well at 5,000 hours and more.

== Deuterium lamp spectra ==
The deuterium lamp emits radiation extending from 112 nm to 900 nm, though its continuous spectrum is only from 180 nm to 370 nm. The spectrum intensity does not actually decrease from 250 nm to 200 nm as shown in the spectrum plot above. The decrease in the plot is due to decreased efficiency at low wavelengths of the photo detector used to measure the lamp intensity. The deuterium lamp's continuous spectrum is useful as both a reference in UV radiometric work and to generate a signal in various photometric devices.

== Safety ==
Due to the high intensity of UV radiation emitted by the bulb, eye protection is suggested when using a deuterium bulb. Care must also be taken to not touch the bulb directly to avoid burns due to high operating temperatures. Touching the bulb directly even when cool could deposit impurities onto the casing that strongly absorb the short wavelength UV and therefore reduce output intensity.
