= Hydrophobic light-activated adhesive =

- Type: Glue
- Manufacturer: Boston Children's Hospital; MIT; Harvard-affiliated Brigham and Women's Hospital

Hydrophobic light-activated adhesive (HLAA) is a type of glue that sets in seconds, but only after exposure to ultraviolet light. One biocompatible, biodegradable HLAA is under consideration for use in human tissue repair as a replacement for sutures, staples and other approaches.

== History ==
The glue was developed in a collaboration between Boston Children's Hospital, MIT and Harvard-affiliated Brigham and Women's Hospital. It was inspired by the viscous, water-repellant fluids secreted by animals such as slugs, sandcastle worms and insect footpads.

== Heart repair ==
HLAA has been used experimentally to repair holes in pig hearts. It provides a hemostatic seal that adheres to the heart tissue despite immersion in liquid blood. It is not rejected by the body and is sufficiently adhesive and elastic that it is not pulled loose or damaged by the contractions of the heart muscle. It harmlessly biodegrades over time. The lack of stitching or stapling implies that procedures for applying glue-treated patches are potentially considerably less invasive than the alternatives. The polymer becomes physically entangled with collagen and other proteins on the tissue surface rather than adhering via a chemical reaction.

== Alternatives ==
Sutures can damage heart tissue and take too long to apply. Staples can also damage heart tissue. Existing surgical adhesives can be toxic, and they can become unstuck in wet, dynamic environments such as the heart. As a result, infants often require subsequent operations to "replug" the hole. One other surgical adhesive cures when exposed to water.
