= Virucide =

Agent that deactivates or destroys viruses

A virucide (alternatively spelled viricide) is any physical or chemical agent that deactivates or destroys viruses. The substances are not only virucidal but can be also bactericidal, fungicidal, sporicidal or tuberculocidal.

Virucides are to be used outside the human body, and as such fall into the category of disinfectants (applied not to the human body) and antiseptics (applied to the surface of skin) for those safe enough. Overall, the notion of virucide differs from an antiviral drug such as Aciclovir, which inhibits the proliferation of the virus inside the body.

CDC's Disinfection and Sterilization list of Chemical Disinfectants mentions and discusses substances such as: alcohol, chlorine and chlorine compounds, formaldehyde, glutaraldehyde, hydrogen peroxide, iodophors, ortho-phthalaldehyde (OPA), peracetic acid, peracetic acid and hydrogen peroxide, phenolics, quaternary ammonium compounds, with different, but usually potent microbicidal activity. Other inactivating agents such as UV light, metals, and ozone exist.

== Definitions ==
According to the Centers for Disease Control and Prevention (CDC), a virucide is "An agent that kills viruses to make them noninfective."

According to a definition by Robert Koch Institute Germany and further institutions, virucide means effective against enveloped and non-enveloped viruses.

Due to the complexity of the subject, in Germany, Robert-Koch-Institute introduced sub-definitions such as "limited virucidal" or "limited virucidal plus" (translated from German) to differentiate its meaning further.

Note that the meaning of virus inactivation or viral clearance is specific for the medical process industry, i.e., to remove HIV from blood.

== Functioning ==
Different substances have interactions between microbicides and viruses such as:

- Alteration of the viral envelope
- Structural alteration
- Alteration of viral markers or
- Alteration of the viral genome

The exact mechanisms, for example of iodine (PVP-I), are still not clear, but it is targeting the bacterial protein synthesis due to disruption of electron transport, DNA denaturation or disruptive effects on the virus membrane.

== Registration ==
The U.S. Centers for Disease Control and Prevention administers a regulatory framework for disinfectants and sterilants. To earn virucidal registration, extensive data on harder-to-kill viruses demonstrating long-lasting virucidal efficacy need to be provided.

=== Regulations ===
- Europe: Biocide products regulation EN 528/2012

=== Testing ===
- EN 14476:2019 (suspensions test)
- EN 16777:2018 (surfaces test)
- EN 1500 (hand rub test)
- ISO 18184:2019 (textile products)
- ISO 21702:2019 (plastics and non-porous surfaces)

=== Other related tests ===
A specific protocol for hand-hygiene testing has been researched and established by microbiologist Prof. Graham Ayliffe.

== Safety ==
Virucides are not intended for use inside the body, and most are disinfectants that are not intended for use on the surface of the body. Most substances are toxic. None of the listed substances replaces vaccination or antiviral drugs, if available. Virucides are usually labeled with instructions for safe, effective use. The correct use and scope of disinfectants is very important.

Potential serious side-effects with using "quats" (Quaternary ammonium compounds) exist, and over-use "can have a negative impact on your customers' septic systems."

Mouth-rinsing or gargling can reduce virus load, however experts warn that "Viruses in the nose, lungs or trachea that are released when speaking, sneezing and coughing are unlikely to be reached because the effect is based on physical accessibility of the surface mucous membrane".

According to Deutsche Dermatologische Gesellschaft, medical practitioners recommend that disinfectants are gentler on the skin compared to soap-washing. The disinfected hands should then also be creamed to support the regeneration of the skin barrier. Skin care does not reduce the antiseptic effect of the alcoholic disinfectants.

The "explosive" use of antibacterial cleansers has led the CDC to monitor substances in adults.

On April 5, 2021, a Press Briefing by White House COVID-19 Response Team and Public Health Officials mentions that "Cleaning with household cleaners containing soap or detergent will physically remove germs from surfaces. This process does not necessarily kill germs, but reduces the risk of infection by removing them. Disinfecting uses a chemical product, which is a process that kills the germs on the surfaces. In most situations, regular cleaning of surfaces with soap and detergent, not necessarily disinfecting those surfaces, is enough to reduce the risk of COVID-19 spread. Disinfection is only recommended in indoor settings — schools and homes — where there has been a suspected or confirmed case of COVID-19 within the last 24 hours. In most situations, regular cleaning of surfaces with soap and detergent, not necessarily disinfecting those surfaces, is enough to reduce the risk of COVID-19 spread."

The CDC issued a special report "Knowledge and Practices Regarding Safe Household Cleaning and Disinfection for COVID-19 Prevention" due to the increased number of calls to poison centers regarding exposures to cleaners and disinfectants since the onset of the COVID-19 pandemic, concluding that "Public messaging should continue to emphasize evidence-based, safe cleaning and disinfection practices to prevent SARS-CoV-2 transmission in households, including hand hygiene and cleaning and disinfection of high-touch surfaces."

CDC provides a Guideline for Disinfection and Sterilization in Healthcare Facilities.

== Microbicidal activity ==
Each mentioned item in the list has different microbicidal activity, i.e. some viruses can be more or less resistant. For example, Poliovirus is resistant to a solution of 3% H_{2}O_{2} even after a contact time of 10 minutes, however 7.5% H_{2}O_{2} takes 30 minutes to inactivate over 99.9% of Poliovirus. Generally, hydrogen peroxide is considered as a potent virucide in appropriate concentrations, specifically in other forms such gaseous.

Another example is povidone-iodine (PVP-I), which is found to be effective against herpes simplex virus or SARS-CoV-2, and other viruses, but coxsackievirus and polio was rather resistant or less sensitive to inactivation.

=== SARS-CoV-2 (COVID-19) ===
In the beginning of the COVID-19 pandemic, then-US President Donald Trump delivered a very dangerous message to the public on the use of disinfectants, which was immediately rejected and refuted by health professionals. In essence, and as mentioned above, virucides are usually toxic depending on concentrations, mixture, etc., and can be deadly not just to viruses, but also if inside a human or animal body or on surface of body.

With regards to the COVID-19 pandemic, some of the mentioned agents are still under research about their microbicidal activity and effectivity against SARS-CoV-2, e.g., on surfaces, as mouth-washes, hand-washing, etc.

A mixture of 62–71% ethanol, 0.5% hydrogen peroxide or 0.1% sodium hypochlorite is found to be able to deactivate the novel Coronavirus on surfaces within 1 minute.

A 2020 systematic review on hydrogen peroxide (H_{2}O_{2}) mouth-washes concludes, that they don't have an effect on virucidal activity, recommending that "dental care protocols during the COVID-19 pandemic should be revised." Additional research with relation to the Coronavirus virucidal efficacy is on-going.

Various information and overview of light-based strategies (UV-C and other types of light sources; see also Ultraviolet germicidal irradiation) to combat the COVID-19 pandemic are available.

As systematic review of 16 studies by Cochrane on Antimicrobial mouthwashes (gargling) and nasal sprays concludes that "there is currently no evidence relating to the benefits and risks of patients with COVID‐19 using antimicrobial mouthwashes or nasal sprays."

=== SARS-CoV ===
Treatment of SARS-CoV for 2 min with Isodine (PVP-I) is found to strongly reduce the virus infectivity.

== Research ==
The International Society of Antimicrobial Chemotherapy (ISAC) is one of the major umbrella organizations for education, research and development in the area of therapy of infections. Its members are national organizations, currently 86 and over 50,000 individual members.

== List of virucides ==
Note that many of the substances, if sold commercially, are usually combinations and mixtures with varying molecular contents. Also note that most products have a limited viricide efficacy. A specific test-protocol is applied. The lists' scope is limited. For further products refer to other lists. Other factors such as stability of the concentrate, application concentration, exposure time, timing of the solution, hydrogen ion concentration (pH value), temperature, etc. play an certain role for the effectivity of a virucide.

EPA is providing a public listing called "List N"

=== General substance listing of active component or compound ===
- 1-Docosanol
- Alcohols:
  - Ethanol
  - Isopropyl alcohol
  - n-propanol
- Benzalkonium chlorides, e.g.,
  - Alkyl dimethyl benzyl ammonium chlorides (C12-16)
  - Alkyl dimethyl benzyl ammonium chloride (C14 60%, C16 30%, C12 5%, C18 5%)
  - Alkyl dimethyl ethylbenzyl ammonium chloride (C12-14)
  - Alkyl dimethyl ethylbenzyl ammonium chlorides (C12-18)
- Bleach (Sodium hypochlorite)
  - Sodium hypochlorite washes
- Didecyldimethylammonium chloride
- Hand washing (see also Surfactants)
  - Hand washing is a mechanical process of removing germs and viruses, and chemicals.
  - Hand washing with, e.g., ethanol added to a hand disinfectant shows virucidal effects, but caution is given (small children) and it is not recommended over "proper hand washing".
  - Hand gels are often found to not comply with EN 1500 standards to meet antimicrobial efficacy.
  - Prof. Graham Ayliffe's hand-cleaning and disinfection technique is promoted nowadays by the WHO and is similar to German standard DIN EN 1500 (hygienic hand disinfection).
- Hydrogen peroxide
- Oral rinse (see Cochrane systematic review in case of SARS-CoV-2)
  - Chlorhexidine (CHX) - mainly against enveloped viruses.
  - Dequalinium
- Povidone-iodine (Isodine, PVP-I),
  - High potency for virucidal activity has been observed against viruses of significant global concern, including hepatitis A and influenza, as well as the Middle-East Respiratory Syndrome and Sudden Acute Respiratory Syndrome coronaviruses.
  - Application types and names: Isodine, Scrub, Isodine Nodo Fresh
- Surfactants
  - Soap
  - Triton X-100

=== Example products ===
- Betadine products and medical variants by Avrio Health (part of Purdue Pharma)
  - Ingredients: Povidon-iodine etc.
  - As of June 2021, not recommended by manufacturer to "kill" coronaviruses.
- Bleach products:
  - Clorox
  - Cyosan
  - Zonrox Bleach
- Henkel products:
  - biff Hygiene Total
    - Ingredients: Benzalkonium chloride and formic acid
    - Tested against SARS-CoV-2 according to producer statement on website.
  - Bref Power Bakterien & Schimmel
  - Purex
- Heitmann Hygiene & Care products:
  - Universal Hygiene Laundry Rinse 1.5
    - Ingredients: Didecyldimethylammonium chloride
  - Hygiene Spray
    - Ingredients: Ethanol, 2-propanol
    - According to manufacturer is effective against coronaviruses, including SARS-CoV-2
- Listerine
  - Ingredients: Alcohol, sodium fluoride, essential oils (specifically in case of management of inflammatory periodontal diseases)
  - Unknown or limited virucidal activity
- Lysol
  - Ingredient: Benzalkonium chloride
  - Some of the products having been tested against SARS-CoV-2.
- Sterillium
  - Ingredients: 1-Propanol, 2-propanol and mecetronium ethylsulfate
  - By former Bode Chemie, now Hartmann AG, one of Germany's major health-care brands available in 50 countries, and according to website "the world's most scientifically researched hand disinfectant with approximately 60 scientific publications in trade journals in 2015."

=== Other substances, drugs, proteins, therapeutics, research-level topics ===
- Antimicrobial peptides
- Auriclosene (NVC-422) - see also Keratoconjunctivitis
- Bacteriocin
- Chlorine dioxide
- Copper alloys
- CLR01 (Molecular tweezers) found to inhibit Ebola, Zika or possibly SARS-CoV-2
- Cyanovirin-N
- General so called "Drug repurposing" for example in case of SARS-CoV-2/COVID-19
- Griffithsin
- Interferon
- Nanomedicines
- "Novel Anti-Infectives" research by Helmholtz Centre for Infection Research
- Peracetic acid
- Scytovirin
- Urumin

==== Agricultural, veterinary ====
- Vanproz V-Bind
- Virkon
- Turnip yellow mosaic virus (TuYV) resistant products, such as Bayer AG's DK Excited

== See also ==
- Bacteriostatic agent
- Disinfectant
- Enveloped virus
- List of cleaning products#Disinfectants
- Log reduction
