= CVNH domain =

CVNH
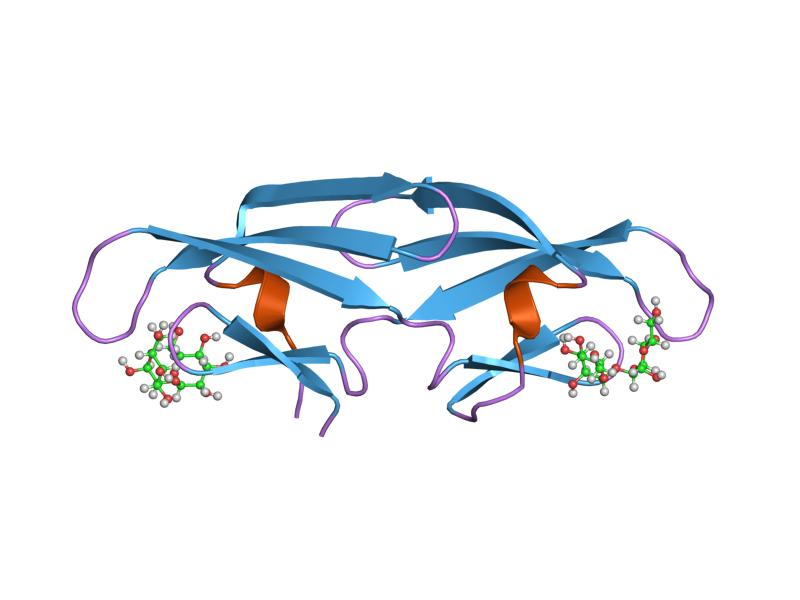
- solution nmr structure of complex of 1:2 cyanovirin-n:man-alpha1,2-man-alpha restrained regularized mean coordinates

Identifiers
- Symbol: CVNH
- Pfam: PF08881
- InterPro: IPR011058
Available protein structures:
- Pfam: structures / ECOD
- PDB: RCSB PDB; PDBe; PDBj
- PDBsum: structure summary

In molecular biology, the CVNH domain (CyanoVirin-N Homology domain) is a conserved protein domain. It is found in the sugar-binding antiviral protein cyanovirin-N (CVN) as well as proteins from filamentous ascomycetes and in the fern Ceratopteris richardii.

Cyanovirin-N (CV-N) is an 11-kDa protein from the cyanobacterium Nostoc ellipsosporum that displays virucidal activity against several viruses, including human immunodeficiency virus (AIDS). The virucidal activity of CV-N is mediated through specific high-affinity interactions with the viral surface envelope glycoproteins gp120 and gp41, as well as to high-mannose oligosaccharides found on the HIV envelope. In addition, CV-N is active against rhinoviruses, human parainfluenza virus, respiratory syncytial virus, and enteric viruses. The virucidal activity of CV-N against influenza virus is directed towards viral haemagglutinin. CV-N has a complex fold composed of a duplication of a tandem repeat of two homologous motifs comprising three-stranded beta sheet and beta hairpins.
