= Scytonema varium =

Scientific classification
- Domain: Bacteria
- Kingdom: Bacillati
- Phylum: Cyanobacteria
- Class: Cyanophyceae
- Order: Nostocales
- Family: Scytonemataceae
- Genus: Scytonema
- Species: S. varium

Binomial name
- Scytonema varium Kützing, 1849

Species of bacterium

Scytonema varium is a cultured cyanobacterium of the genus Scytonema. It is one of many anti viral protein producing algae. In a similar manner to Cyanovirin-N from Nostoc Ellipsosporum and griffithsin from the red algae Griffithsia, Scytonema varium secretes the broad-spectrum antiviral protein scytovirin which can inactivate both the HIV virus, and Ebola virus, offering hope of treatment for many diseases with viral etiology (cause). It is currently being investigated as a topical microbicide for HIV prophylaxis.
