= David J. Brenner =

American biophysicist

David J. Brenner is an American theoretical physicist and Higgins Professor of Radiation Biophysics, College of Physicians & Surgeons of Columbia University. His interest is in finding mathematical and physics related solutions to biological problems. Born in Liverpool, England, he received his doctorate from Oxford University.

After the Fukushima I nuclear accidents, he advocated the redoubling of efforts in understanding the health risks of low doses of radiation. Following the death of a close friend due to a superbug, i.e., a microbe with multiple drug resistance, Brenner began research into an ultraviolet germicidal irradiation solution against the spread of some diseases through pathogenic microorganisms. Ultraviolet (UV) is normally hazardous both to microbes and humans. He discovered that a far-UVC band of light within a confined wavelength range around 200 nanometers was cytotoxic to bacteria but appeared, unlike wide band UV, to be absorbed by, and not to penetrate beyond, the outer dead layers of skin, and not to damage eyes. He is continuing his research on the safety and potential extended medical applications (including against airborne viruses) of far-UVC light. He foresees the potential use in hospitals, schools, etc., to help restrict the spread of microbial and viral based disease.
