= Scytovirin =

Antiviral protein

Identifiers
- Organism: Scytonema varium (Cyanobacterium)
- Symbol: SVR

Scytovirin is a 95-amino acid antiviral protein isolated from the cyanobacteria Scytonema varium. It has been cultured in E. coli and its structure investigated in detail. Scytovirin is thought to be produced by the bacteria to protect itself from viruses that might otherwise attack it, but as it has broad-spectrum antiviral activity against a range of enveloped viruses, scytovirin has also been found to be useful against a range of major human pathogens, most notably HIV / AIDS but also including SARS coronavirus and filoviruses such as Ebola virus and Marburg virus. While some lectins such as cyanovirin and Urtica dioica agglutinin are thought likely to be too allergenic to be used internally in humans, studies so far on scytovirin and griffithsin have not shown a similar level of immunogenicity. Scytovirin and griffithsin are currently being investigated as potential microbicides for topical use.
