= Graham Ayliffe =

English medical microbiologist

- Born: 2 March 1926; Hambrook, Gloucestershire, UK
- Died: 22 May 2017 (aged 91)
- Occupation: Microbiologist

Graham Arthur John Ayliffe (2 March 1926 – 22 May 2017) was a British medical microbiologist and emeritus professor in medical microbiology and the University of Birmingham, United Kingdom. He was instrumental in founding the International Federation for Infection Control (IFIC) in association with the World Health Organization (WHO) in 1987. He was elected chair in 1990. He was also a founder member of the Hospital Infection Society (now Healthcare Infection Society) and editor of its journal (1980–84), a former chair (1980–84) and president (1988–94). The Graham Ayliffe Training Fellowship was established in 2013.

== Career ==
Graham Ayliffe was born in Hambrook, Gloucestershire, England and educated at Queen Elizabeth's Hospital School in Bristol. He served for three years in the Royal Navy as a medical assistant/laboratory technician and then went on to study Medicine at Bristol University. He joined the Department of Pathology at the Bristol Royal Infirmary under Professor William Gillespie in 1955. In 1959 he moved on to the Department of Bacteriology at Hammersmith Hospital under Mary Barber. He was awarded an MD from the University of Bristol in 1963.

In 1964 he joined the team at the Hospital Research Laboratory (HIRL) in what is now known as City Hospital, Birmingham led by Edward Lowbury. The research team at Birmingham carried out numerous surveys of hospital infection and explored the necessity of hand hygiene, the emergence of antibiotic resistance and surgical site infection (SSI).

The team at Birmingham (Ayliffe, J. R. Babb, A. H. Quoraishi) developed the six step hand-washing technique (known as the Ayliffe Technique). The technique was soon adopted by hospitals throughout the UK and was endorsed by the World Health Organization in 2009 and is similar to German standard DIN EN 1500 (hygienic hand disinfection).

He was appointed director of the HIRL in 1980 following Lowbury's retirement and he was appointed professor of medical microbiology at the University of Birmingham in 1981 where he developed a practical course for medical students. His research interests included the control of MRSA, biological safety and endoscope decontamination.

== Writing ==
He authored and co-authored numerous books and academic papers including:

- Hospital Infection: From Miasmas to MRSA, Ayliffe, G.A.J, English, M.P (2003, Cambridge University Press, Cambridge)
- Hospital-Acquired Infection: Principles and Prevention, Ayliffe, G.A.J, Collins, B.J, Taylor, A.J (1982, John Wright & Sons, Bristol)
- Control of Hospital Infection: A Practical Handbook, Ayliffe, G.A.J, Geddes, A.M, Williams, JD, 1975, Chapman & Hall, London
- Drug Resistance in Antimicrobial Therapy, Lowbury, E.J.L, Ayliffe G.A.J. (Springfield, Illinois, 1974)

== Personal life ==
Ayliffe married Janet Lloyd in 1963 and they had two children. He was the Honorary President of Birmingham Fencing Club up to his death on 22 May 2017 at the age of 91.
