= Far-UVC =

Emerging subtype of germicidal UV light

The location of 'far-UVC' radiation (200-235 nm) in the electromagnetic spectrum

Far UVC is a type of ultraviolet germicidal irradiation being studied and commercially developed for its combination of pathogen inactivation properties and reduced negative effects on human health when used within exposure guidelines.

Far UVC (200-235 nm), while part of the broader UV-C spectrum (100-280 nm), is distinguished by its unique biophysical effects on living tissues. Unlike conventional UV-C lamps (which typically have peak emissions at 254 nm), far UVC demonstrates significantly reduced penetration into biological tissue. This limited penetration depth is primarily due to strong absorption by proteins at wavelengths below 240 nm. Consequently, far-UVC photons are mostly absorbed in the outer protective layers of skin and eyes before reaching sensitive cells, resulting in greater safety. However, far UVC can still lead to negative health effects through reactive byproducts like ozone.

While the technology has been studied since the early 2010s, heightened demand for disinfectant tools during the COVID-19 pandemic played a significant role in spurring both academic and commercial interest into far UVC. Unlike conventional germicidal UV-C lamps, which are limited to upper-room (above people's heads) pathogen inactivation or use in unoccupied spaces, due to their negative effects on human skin and eyes, far UVC is considered promising for whole-room pathogen inactivation due to its enhanced safety. The installation of far-UVC lights on ceilings would potentially enable direct disinfection of the breathing zone while people are present.

Although far UVC shows potential for implementation in a wide variety of use cases, its wider adoption as a pandemic prevention strategy requires further research around its safety and efficacy.

== Historical development ==
Far UVC's development was primarily led by the research of Dr. David J. Brenner and his colleagues (including David Welch and Manuela Buonanno) at Columbia University's Center for Radiological Research. In the early 2010s, Brenner initially studied far UVC for its potential as a surgical site disinfectant. Over the next decade, his lab began to study the technology for its ability to prevent the airborne transmission of pathogens, as well as its health effects on mammalian skin. In 2018, a seminal paper published by Brenner's lab announced the technology as an inexpensive and safe technology to reduce the spread of airborne microbial diseases like tuberculosis and influenza.

During the COVID-19 pandemic far-UVC research and commercialization efforts increased. The technology is currently being further studied for its safety and efficacy, particularly regarding its effect on ozone creation and interactions with indoor air chemistry and the built environment. Latest studies uphold initial evidence towards the technology's germicidal efficacy in realistic room-like environments. These finding pave the way for future wearable garments which can disinfect a programmable area in the vicinity of the user on demand.

== Safety and efficacy ==
Research from the Brenner lab and other scientists has demonstrated the improved safety and efficacy profile of far UVC compared to other ultraviolet wavelengths. A 2025 review article concluded that the wavelength of 222 nm had a "high ability" to kill pathogens, and a "high level of safety", but that further research was required on the effects of long-term exposure before widespread use, as well as further research on its efficacy in real-world scenarios, as opposed to laboratory conditions.

When evaluating ultraviolet germicidal lights, eye and skin health are primary concerns. UV-B, predominantly responsible for the harmful effects of sunlight, poses the highest risk for erythema, photokeratitis, sunburn and skin cancer. While longer UV-C wavelengths and UV-A can also cause damage, their effects are less severe than UV-B.

In contrast, far UVC has shown remarkably different results. Studies on both lab mice and humans have found no significant impact on skin health, even at doses far exceeding current guidelines. This enhanced safety is attributed to far UVC's difficulty in penetrating the outermost layer of the epidermis called the stratum corneum. The stratum corneum is effective at blocking far UVC as it's composed primarily of dead cells filled with keratin protein, which absorb far-UVC light.

Regarding ocular safety, while comprehensive human studies are still pending, limited research has been conducted on human eye exposure to overhead far-UVC lamps. These studies have found no evidence of damage or increased discomfort. Additionally, research on rats has revealed significantly reduced penetration and damage from far UVC compared to other UV wavelengths. These findings suggest a promising safety profile for far UVC, though further research, particularly on human eyes, is needed to fully establish its long-term effects.

When far UVC interacts with airborne oxygen it produces ozone and other byproducts, an effect that has been demonstrated in laboratory and real world environments. While the extent to which this produced ozone leads to negative health effects is the subject of active research, the mechanism for ozone causing cardiovascular disease and premature mortality is established in outdoor settings.

A key concern for far-UVC implementations is balancing radiation dosage and microbial inactivation rates. Although far UVC has been shown to be effective at inactivating a wide array at viruses at doses that fall beneath exposure limits, the optimal dosage for achieving sufficient deactivation and indoor air quality standards requires further study.

Positive skin and eye safety attributes can be forgone if a given far-UVC lamp produces unwanted emissions at wavelengths other than the a device's stated specifications. For this reason, optical filters have been suggested as a mitigation device. Mitigation techniques also have been studied for ozone production.

A Far-UVC Krypton Chloride excimer lamp is used to disinfect the air in a National Guard facility.

== Far-UVC devices and commercialization ==
The most common device used to generate far-UVC radiation is a Krypton Chloride (KrCl) excimer lamp, which emits light at the 222 nm wavelength. Following the sudden increase in demand for disinfectant tools brought upon by the COVID-19 pandemic, a number of companies began to market and sell consumer far-UVC devices. These devices come in many different configurations and commercial form factors. There are no public estimates available for the size of the far-UVC device industry.

== Regulation ==
Considering the technology's evolving nature, regulatory bodies around the world have not yet created binding standards as to what is considered a safe and effective dosage for far-UVC implementations, nor have they created certifications or passed regulations for the safety of commercial far-UVC devices. Legislation has been proposed for governing the production of ozone from germicidal UV light in California. In lieu of formal regulations or standards, guidelines for exposure limits and indoor air quality are put in place by professional associations. Some have suggested that these exposure limits are too conservative and need to be revised for shorter wavelength UV-C.
