= Germicidal lamp =

Ultraviolet C light-emitting device

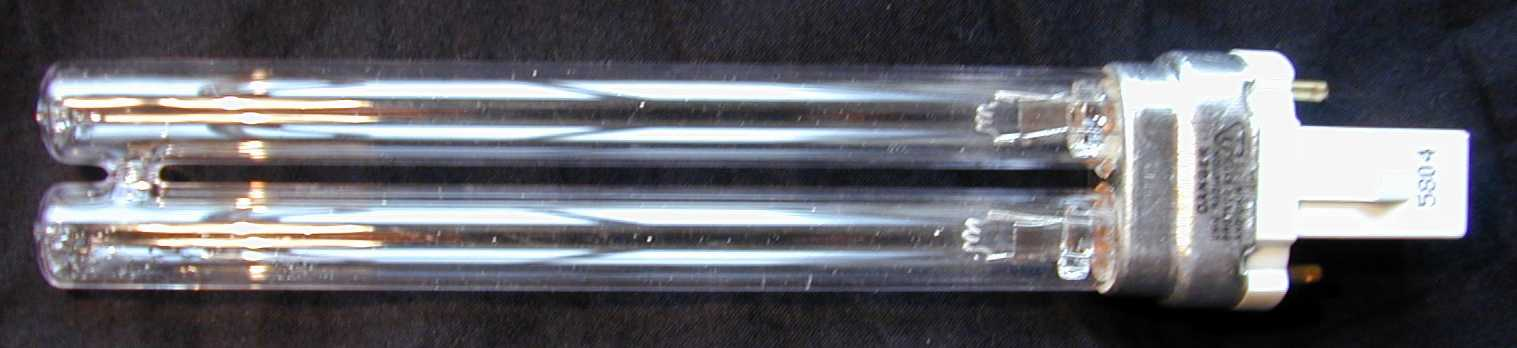
A 9W germicidal lamp in a modern compact fluorescent lamp form factor

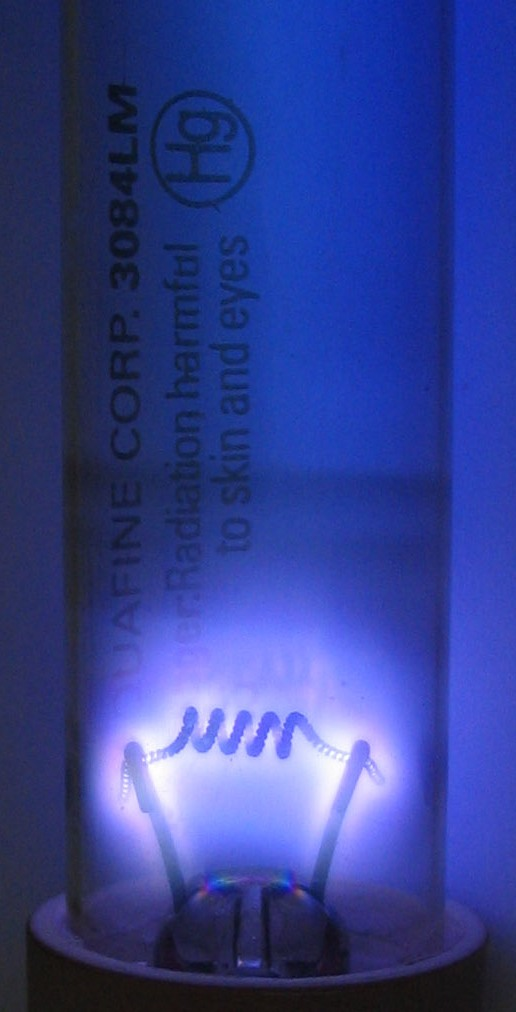
Glow of a germicidal lamp excited by a high voltage probe.

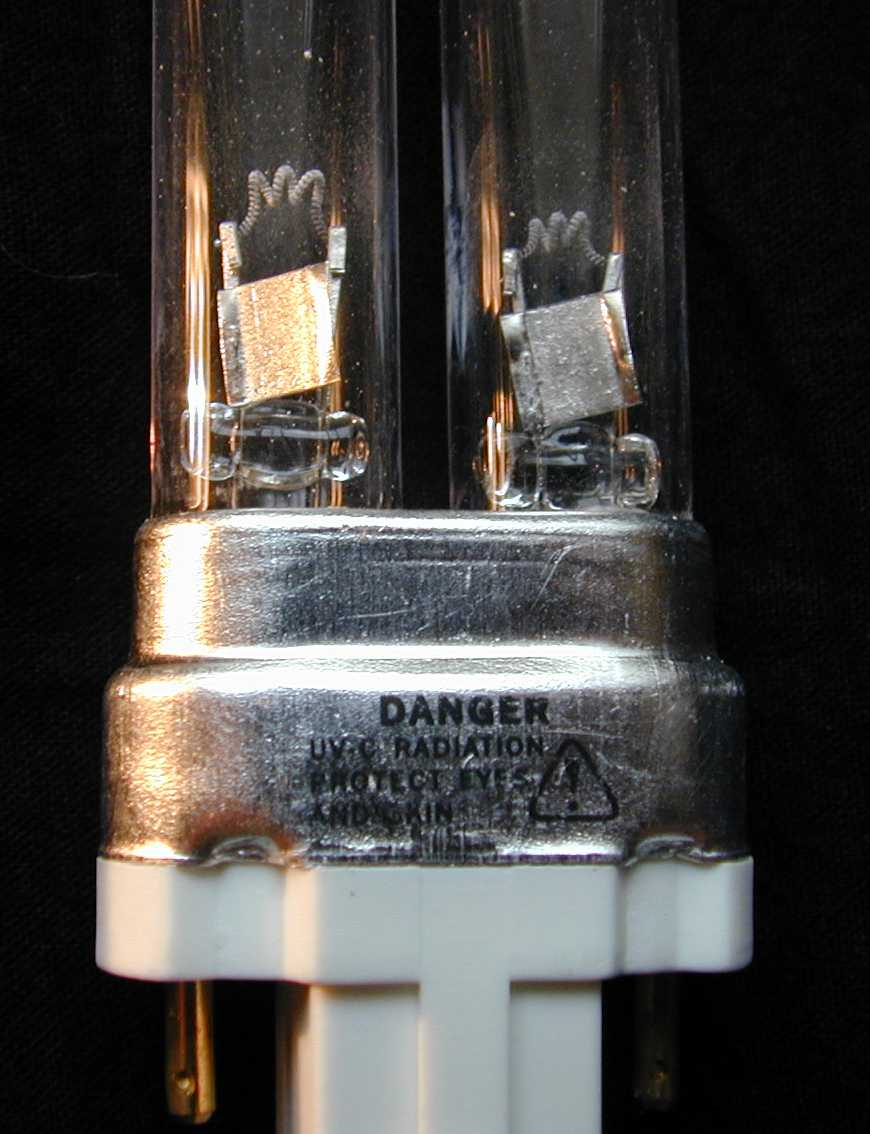
Close-up of the electrodes and the safety warning

A germicidal lamp (also known as disinfection lamp or sterilizer lamp) is an electric light that produces ultraviolet C (UVC) light. This short-wave ultraviolet light disrupts DNA base pairing, causing formation of pyrimidine dimers, and leads to the inactivation of bacteria, viruses, and protozoans. It can also be used to produce ozone for water disinfection. They are used in ultraviolet germicidal irradiation (UVGI).

There are four common types available:

- Low-pressure mercury lamps
- High-pressure mercury lamps
- Excimer lamps
- LEDs

== Low-pressure mercury lamps ==
Low-pressure mercury lamps are very similar to a fluorescent lamp, with a wavelength of 253.7 nm (1182.5 THz).

The most common form of germicidal lamp looks similar to an ordinary fluorescent lamp but the tube contains no fluorescent phosphor. In addition, rather than being made of ordinary borosilicate glass, the tube is made of fused quartz or vycor 7913 glass. These two changes combine to allow the 253.7 nm ultraviolet light produced by the mercury arc to pass out of the lamp unmodified (whereas, in common fluorescent lamps, it causes the phosphor to fluoresce, producing visible light). Germicidal lamps still produce a small amount of visible light due to other mercury radiation bands.

An older design looks like an incandescent lamp but with the envelope containing a few droplets of mercury. In this design, the incandescent filament heats the mercury, producing a vapor which eventually allows an arc to be struck, short circuiting the incandescent filament.

As with all gas-discharge lamps, low- and high-pressure mercury lamps exhibit negative resistance and require the use of an external ballast to regulate the current flow. The older lamps that resembled an incandescent lamp were often operated in series with an ordinary 40 W incandescent "appliance" lamp; the incandescent lamp acted as the ballast for the germicidal lamp.

== High-pressure mercury lamps ==
High-pressure lamps are much more similar to HID lamps than fluorescent lamps.

These lamps radiate a broad-band UVC radiation, rather than a single line. They are widely used in industrial water treatment, because they are very intense radiation sources. High-pressure lamps produce very bright bluish white light.

== Excimer lamps ==
Excimer lamps emit narrow-band UVC and vacuum-ultraviolet radiation at a variety of wavelengths depending on the medium. They are mercury-free and reach full output quicker than a mercury lamp, and generate less heat. Excimer emission at 207 and 222 nm appears to be safer than traditional 254 nm germicidal radiation, due to greatly reduced penetration of these wavelengths in human skin.

== Light-emitting diodes (LEDs) ==
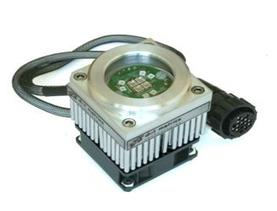
UVC LED lamp with heatsink and power cable

Recent developments in light-emitting diode (LED) technology have led to the commercial availability of UVC LED sources.

UVC LEDs use semiconductor materials to produce light in a solid-state device. The wavelength of emission is tuneable by adjusting the chemistry of the semiconductor material, giving a selectivity to the emission profile of the LED across, and beyond, the germicidal wavelength band. Advances in understanding and synthesis of the AlGaN materials system led to significant increases in the output power, device lifetime, and efficiency of UVC LEDs in the early 2010s.

The reduced size of LEDs opens up options for small reactor systems allowing point-of-use applications and integration into medical devices. Low power consumption of semiconductors introduce UV disinfection systems that utilized small solar cells in remote or Third World applications.

By 2019, LEDs made up 41.4% of UV light sales, up from 19.2% in 2014 The UV-C LED global market is expected to rise from $223m in 2017 to US$991m in 2023.

== Uses ==
Germicidal lamps are used to sterilize workspaces and tools used in biology laboratories and medical facilities. If the quartz envelope transmits shorter wavelengths, such as the 185 nm mercury emission line, they can also be used wherever ozone is desired, for example, in the sanitizing systems of hot tubs and aquariums. They are also used by geologists to provoke fluorescence in mineral samples, aiding in their identification. In this application, the light produced by the lamp is usually filtered to remove as much visible light as possible, leaving just the UV light. Germicidal lamps are also used in waste water treatment in order to kill microorganisms.

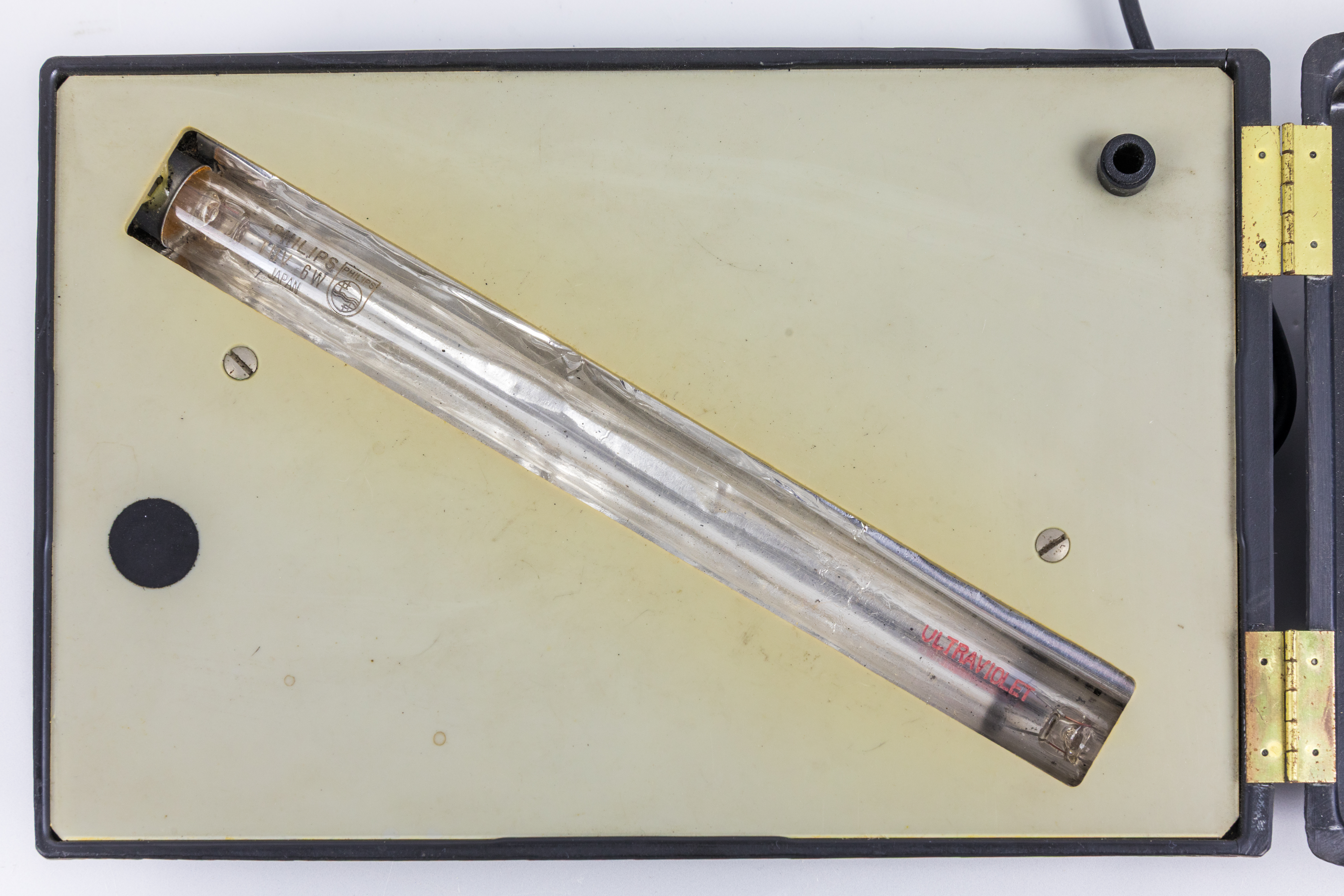
EPROM eraser

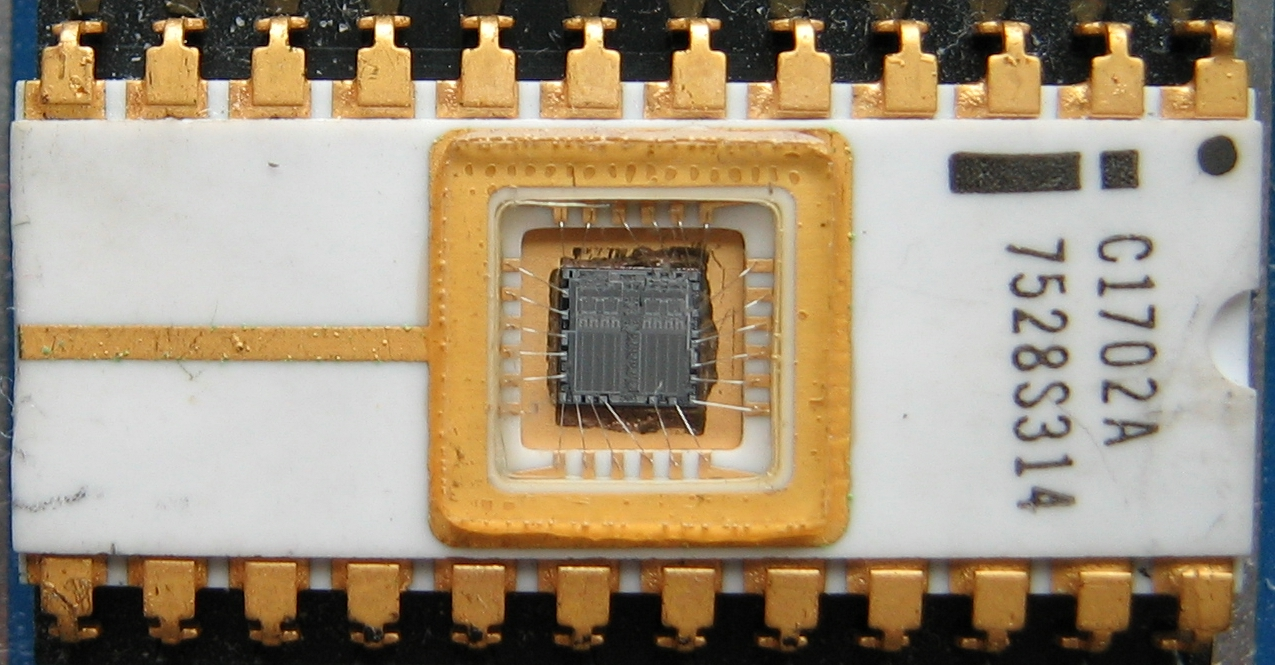
An EPROM. The small quartz window allows UV light to enter during erasure.

The light produced by germicidal lamps is also used to erase EPROMs; the ultraviolet photons are sufficiently energetic to allow the electrons trapped on the transistors' floating gates to tunnel through the gate insulation, eventually removing the stored charge that represents binary ones and zeroes.

== Ozone production ==
For most purposes, ozone production would be a detrimental side effect of lamp operation. To prevent this, most germicidal lamps are treated to absorb the 185 nm mercury emission line (which is the longest wavelength of mercury light which will ionize oxygen).

In some cases (such as water sanitization), ozone production is precisely the point. This requires specialized lamps which do not have the surface treatment.

== Safety concerns ==
Short-wave UV light is harmful to humans. In addition to causing sunburn and (over time) skin cancer, this light can produce extremely painful inflammation of the cornea of the eye, which may lead to temporary or permanent vision impairment. For this reason, the light produced by a germicidal lamp must be carefully shielded against direct viewing, with consideration of reflections and dispersed light. A February 2017 risk analysis of UVC lights concluded that ultraviolet light from these lamps can cause skin and eye problems.
