= Ayliffe technique =

Hand washing technique

The Ayliffe technique is a 1978 six-step hand washing technique, which is attributed to Graham Ayliffe et al., specifically for health care services.

== Technique ==
The technique has been adopted by the World Health Organization (WHO) and is similar to German standard DIN EN 1500 (hygienic hand disinfection)) Evidence suggests that it reduces microbial load on hands.

The six steps of the technique are as follows:

1. Palm to palm.
2. Palm of left hand to the back of the right hand and vice versa.
3. Palm to palm with fingers interlocked.
4. Backs of fingers to the opposing palm.
5. Rotational rubbing of each thumb clasped in the opposing palm.
6. Rotational rubbing backwards and forwards with clasped fingers of one hand in the palm of the other.

The paper states that each action should be performed five times and the procedure should last for 30 seconds.

== See also ==
- Hand washing
