= Mary Barber (bacteriologist) =

British pathologist and bacteriologist (1911–1965)

- Mary Barber (photographer and date unknown)
- Born: 3 April 1911
- Died: 11 September 1965 (aged 54)
- Education: London School of Medicine for Women, Royal Free Hospital
- Known for: Study of penicillin-resistant bacteria
- Scientific career
- Fields: bacteriology, pathology
- Workplaces: Royal Free Hospital, British Postgraduate Medical School, St. Thomas's Hospital

Mary Barber (3 April 1911 – 11 September 1965) was a British pathologist and bacteriologist who studied antibiotic resistance in bacteria. She was one of the pioneers in this field, documenting the phenomenon of penicillin resistance early on.

== Life ==
Barber was born on 3 April 1911 in Derby to mother Ether Howlett and father Hugh Barber. Her father, Dr Hugh Barber, was a distinguished physician who trained at Guy's Hospital. Of their three daughters, Mary was the only one to follow her father into medicine, becoming a fifth-generation physician. Barber received her early education at the Alice Ottley School in Worcester. For most of her life, she lived in a London flat; she never married. Throughout her life, Barber possessed strong political and religious beliefs, as a firm political liberal and devout Anglican. She was described as being direct - approaching authority without fear, coming quickly to the point, as well as outspoken on issues with which she did not agree. She died in a car accident on 11 September 1965 at the age of 54, along with a companion, en route to a Campaign for Nuclear Disarmament meeting. Her colleague described her death as "appallingly sudden and premature." She was known for her distinctive appearance, including glasses, no makeup, a pulled-back hairstyle, and utilitarian clothing. Her hobbies included boating.

== Education and career ==
=== Formal education ===
In 1928 Barber completed her clinical training at the London School of Medicine for Women. In 1934 she received her joint degree - the MRCS (Membership of the Royal College of Surgeons) and LRCP (Licentiate of the Royal College of Physicians) - from the Royal Free Hospital. In 1936 she received the MBBS (Bachelor of Medicine-Bachelor of Surgery) From the Royal Free Hospital. Barber took the London M.D. in pathology in 1940.

=== Career ===
Barber began her career in 1936 as a pathologist at the Royal Free Hospital. While studying for her M.D., she gained experience in a variety of academic and clinical roles. From 1936 to 1937, she was a resident assistant in the hospital's Pathology Unit. During her early career she held numerous positions including house physician, clinical assistant to outpatients, resident pathologist and A.M. Bird Scholar in pathology at the Royal Free Hospital. In 1937 she published her first scientific paper regarding meningitis caused the Listeria bacterium. She became Assistant Pathologist and lecturer in bacteriology at the British Postgraduate Medical School, Hammersmith Hospital. This is when she began her study of the spread of staphylococcal infection in the hospital. In 1938, she moved to the Archway Group Laboratory, where she was an assistant pathologist until 1939; that year, she took the same position at Hill End and the City Hospitals, St. Albans. Her most well-known work, studying penicillin resistance in staphylococci was published in 1947.

In 1947 she was appointed lecturer in bacteriology at the British Postgraduate Medical School. She became a reader in bacteriology at St. Thomas's Hospital Medical School in 1948, spending a few months at the Institute Pasteur in Paris during 1950-1951. She left St. Thomas's in 1958, returning to the British Postgraduate Medical School and being promoted to Reader in Bacteriology. Between 1948 and 1958 her focus shifted to studying cross-infection by staphylococcus in hospitals. It was during this time when she discovered that nursing staff were a major contributor to cross-infections in hospitals, as they became nasal carriers of penicillin-resistant bacteria. Apart from the decade spent at St. Thomas's Hospital, she remained at Hammersmith Hospital until death.

She was a member of the editorial board for the Journal of Clinical Pathology from 1955 until her death. Throughout the 1950s and 1960s, she gave many lectures on the issue of antibiotic resistance, publishing numerous papers. Barber was given the title of Professor of Clinical Bacteriology in 1964 by the University of London and in 1965 was elected to the Royal College of Physicians.

=== Study of antibiotic resistance ===
Barber's research focused on the staphylococcus bacterium as well as various aspects of antibiotics, especially development of penicillin-resistant bacteria. She used epidemiological and invitro methods to study the spread of staphylococcal infection in hospitals. In 1947, she published her best-known work on penicillin resistance in staphylocci, proving that the bacteria were becoming more resistant to the drug over time. She implemented a new technique, phage typing, which made it possible to distinguish different strains based upon their fingerprint within the hospital. She found that this was because bacteria with mutations that caused them to synthesize a penicillin-destroying enzyme were selected during treatment with antibiotics, leading to rapid spread of a single antibiotic-resistant strain throughout the hospital. She found that some staphylococci were able to produce penicillinase (a penicillin-destroying enzyme), and the introduction of penicillin gave them the evolutionary advantage over penicillin-sensitive strains.

Between 1948 and 1958, her focus shifted to cross-infection by Staphylococcus in hospitals. Through her studies, Barber showed that the increase in penicillin-resistant staphylococcus was not caused by selective pressure during patient treatment, but rather due to the spread of multiple resistant strains through the hospital. Her use of the phage-typing technique made it possible to identify that the nurses were the primary transmitters, carrying the infection between wards. Her 1947 paper, published in the British Medical Journal, warned that the increased number of penicillin-resistant staphylococcal strains was "so rapid as to be alarming." Barber was right to be concerned. By late 1957, 88% of Staphylococcus cultures at Hammersmith Hospital were resistant to penicillin, 82% were resistant to tetracycline, and 70% were resistant to a combination of the two. Barber believed the growing antibiotic resistance of staphylococci bacteria was due to the widespread use of antibiotics, as well as hospitals not adhering to antiseptic measures. After she returned to BPMS (British Postgraduate Medical School) in 1958, she expanded upon this work, making a clear case for limiting antibiotic use and combining drugs for maximum effect and minimal increases in drug resistance; these studies were carried out at St. Thomas' Hospital. In seven wards (two female and two male general surgical wards, one female and one male orthopedic ward, and one male urology ward), antibiotic use and staff hygiene were strictly monitored, and nasal swabs were taken from as many patients and staff as possible. In June 1959, the incidence of infections resistant to the antibiotic combination in surgical wards declined to 36%, and that of infections that were sensitive to penicillin rose to 48%.

The policies implemented as a result of her work caused the observed antibiotic resistance in the hospital to drop dramatically. After her successful publications, Barber was hired by the Medical Research Council to study semisynthetic penicillin, cephalosporin, fucidin, lincomycin, and pristinamycin. In 1963, she published Antibiotic and Chemotherapy with L. P. Garrod, an encyclopaedic work on the characteristics and medical uses of various antibiotics. That same year, Barber was appointed a professor; in 1965 she was elected to the Royal College of Physicians.

Throughout her career, Barber was known for being a conscientious and intelligent scientist.
