= Ultraviolet germicidal irradiation =

Disinfection method using ultraviolet light

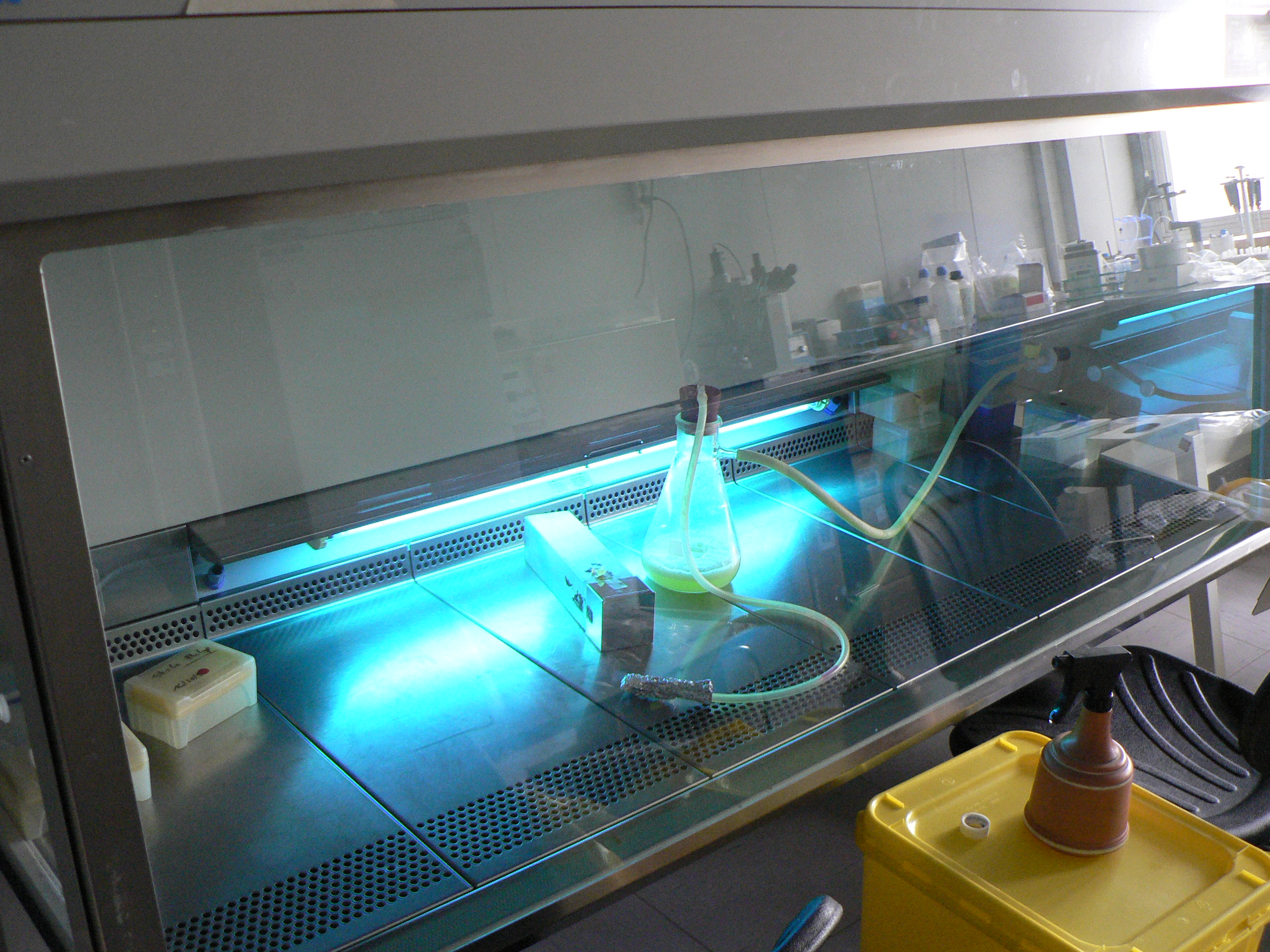
A low-pressure mercury-vapor discharge tube floods the inside of a biosafety cabinet with shortwave UV light when not in use, killing microbes on irradiated surfaces.

Ultraviolet germicidal irradiation (UVGI) is a disinfection technique employing ultraviolet (UV) light, particularly UV-C (180–280 nm), to kill or inactivate microorganisms. UVGI primarily inactivates microbes by damaging their genetic material, thereby inhibiting their capacity to carry out vital functions.

The use of UVGI extends to an array of applications, encompassing food, surface, air, and water disinfection. UVGI devices can inactivate microorganisms including bacteria, viruses, fungi, molds, and other pathogens. Recent studies have substantiated the ability of UV-C light to inactivate SARS-CoV-2, the strain of coronavirus that causes COVID-19.

UV-C wavelengths demonstrate varied germicidal efficacy and effects on biological tissue. Many germicidal lamps like low-pressure mercury (LP-Hg) lamps, with peak emissions around 254 nm, contain UV wavelengths that can be hazardous to humans. As a result, UVGI systems have been primarily limited to applications where people are not directly exposed, including hospital surface disinfection, upper-room UVGI, and water treatment. More recently, the application of wavelengths between 200 and 235 nm, often referred to as far-UVC, has gained traction for surface and air disinfection. These wavelengths are regarded as much safer due to their significantly reduced penetration into human tissue. Moreover, their efficiency relies on the fact that, in addition to the DNA damage related to the formation of pyrimidine dimers, they provoke important DNA photoionization, leading to oxidative damage.

Notably, UV-C light is virtually absent in sunlight reaching the Earth's surface due to the absorptive properties of the ozone layer within the atmosphere.

== History ==
=== Origins of UV germicidal action ===
The development of UVGI traces back to 1878 when Arthur Downes and Thomas Blunt found that sunlight, particularly its shorter wavelengths, hindered microbial growth. Expanding upon this work, Émile Duclaux, in 1885, identified variations in sunlight sensitivity among different bacterial species. A few years later, in 1890, Robert Koch demonstrated the lethal effect of sunlight on Mycobacterium tuberculosis, hinting at UVGI's potential for combating diseases like tuberculosis.

Subsequent studies further defined the wavelengths most efficient for germicidal inactivation. In 1892, it was noted that the UV segment of sunlight had the most potent bactericidal effect. Research conducted in the early 1890s demonstrated the superior germicidal efficacy of UV-C compared to UV-A and UV-B.

The mutagenic effects of UV were first unveiled in a 1914 study that observed metabolic changes in Bacillus anthracis upon exposure to sublethal doses of UV. Frederick Gates, in the late 1920s, offered the first quantitative bactericidal action spectra for Staphylococcus aureus and Bacillus coli, noting peak effectiveness at 265 nm. This matched the absorption spectrum of nucleic acids, hinting at DNA damage as the key factor in bacterial inactivation. This understanding was solidified by the 1960s through research demonstrating the ability of UV-C to form thymine dimers, leading to microbial inactivation. These early findings collectively laid the groundwork for modern UVGI as a disinfection tool.

=== UVGI for air disinfection ===
The utilization of UVGI for air disinfection began in earnest in the mid-1930s. William F. Wells demonstrated in 1935 that airborne infectious organisms, specifically aerosolized B. coli exposed to 254 nm UV, could be rapidly inactivated. This built upon earlier theories of infectious droplet nuclei transmission put forth by Carl Flügge and Wells himself. Prior to this, UV radiation had been studied predominantly in the context of liquid or solid media, rather than airborne microbes.

Shortly after Wells' initial experiments, high-intensity UVGI was employed to disinfect a hospital operating room at Duke University in 1936. The method proved a success, reducing postoperative wound infections from 11.62% without the use of UVGI to 0.24% with the use of UVGI. Soon, this approach was extended to other hospitals and infant wards using UVGI "light curtains", designed to prevent respiratory cross-infections, with noticeable success.

Adjustments in the application of UVGI saw a shift from "light curtains" to upper-room UVGI, confining germicidal irradiation above human head level. Despite its dependency on good vertical air movement, this approach yielded favorable outcomes in preventing cross-infections. This was exemplified by Wells' successful usage of upper-room UVGI between 1937 and 1941 to curtail the spread of measles in suburban Philadelphia day schools. His study found that 53.6% of susceptibles in schools without UVGI became infected, while only 13.3% of susceptibles in schools with UVGI were infected.

Richard L. Riley, initially a student of Wells, continued the study of airborne infection and UVGI throughout the 1950s and 60s, conducting significant experiments in a Veterans Hospital TB ward. Riley successfully demonstrated that UVGI could efficiently inactivate airborne pathogens and prevent the spread of tuberculosis.

Despite initial successes, the use of UVGI declined in the second half of the 20th century era due to various factors, including a rise in alternative infection control and prevention methods, inconsistent efficacy results, and concerns regarding its safety and maintenance requirements. However, recent events like a rise in multiple drug-resistant bacteria and the COVID-19 pandemic have renewed interest in UVGI for air disinfection.

=== UVGI for water treatment ===
Using UV light for disinfection of drinking water dates back to 1910 in Marseille, France. The prototype plant was shut down after a short time due to poor reliability. In 1955, UV water treatment systems were applied in Austria and Switzerland; by 1985 about 1,500 plants were employed in Europe. In 1998 it was discovered that protozoa such as cryptosporidium and giardia were more vulnerable to UV light than previously thought; this opened the way to wide-scale use of UV water treatment in North America. By 2001, over 6,000 UV water treatment plants were operating in Europe.

Over time, UV costs have declined as researchers develop and use new UV methods to disinfect water and wastewater. Several countries have published regulations and guidance for the use of UV to disinfect drinking water supplies, including the US and the UK.

== Method of operation ==
UV light is electromagnetic radiation with wavelengths shorter than visible light but longer than X-rays. UV is categorised into several wavelength ranges, with short-wavelength UV (UV-C) considered "germicidal UV". Wavelengths between about 200 nm and 300 nm are strongly absorbed by nucleic acids. The absorbed energy can result in defects including pyrimidine dimers. These dimers can prevent replication or can prevent the expression of necessary proteins, resulting in the death or inactivation of the organism. Recently, it has been shown that these dimers are fluorescent.

- Mercury-based lamps operating at low vapor pressure emit UV light at the 253.7 nm line.
- Ultraviolet light-emitting diode (UV-C LED) lamps emit UV light at selectable wavelengths between 255 and 280 nm.
- Pulsed-xenon lamps emit UV light across the entire UV spectrum with a peak emission near 230 nm.

This process is similar to, but stronger than, the effect of longer wavelengths (UV-B) producing sunburn in humans. Microorganisms have less protection against UV and cannot survive prolonged exposure to it.

A UVGI system is designed to expose environments such as water tanks, rooms and forced air systems to germicidal UV. Exposure comes from germicidal lamps that emit germicidal UV at the correct wavelength, thus irradiating the environment. The forced flow of air or water through this environment ensures exposure of that air or water.

== Effectiveness ==
The effectiveness of germicidal UV depends on the UV dose, i.e. how much UV light reaches the microbe (measured as radiant exposure) and how susceptible the microbe is to the given wavelength(s) of UV light, defined by the germicidal effectiveness curve.

=== UV Dose ===
The UV dose is measured in light energy per area, i.e. radiant exposure or fluence. The fluence a microbe is exposed to is the product of the light intensity, i.e. irradiance and the time of exposure, according to:

UV dose (μJ/cm^{2}) = UV intensity (μW/cm^{2}) × exposure time (seconds)

Likewise, the irradiance depends on the brightness (radiant intensity, W/sr) of the UV source, the distance between the UV source and the microbe, the attenuation of filters (e.g. fouled glass) in the light path, the attenuation of the medium (e.g. microbes in turbid water), the presence of particles or objects that can shield the microbes from UV, and the presence of reflectors that can direct the same UV-light through the medium multiple times. Additionally, if the microbes are not free-flowing, such as in a biofilm, they will block each other from irradiation.

The U.S. Environmental Protection Agency (EPA) published UV dosage guidelines for drinking water treatment applications in 2006. It is difficult to measure UV dose directly but it can also be estimated from:

- Flow rate (contact time)
- Transmittance (light reaching the target)
- Turbidity (cloudiness)
- Lamp age or fouling or outages (reduction in UV intensity)

Bulbs require periodic cleaning and replacement to ensure effectiveness. The lifetime of germicidal UV bulbs varies depending on design. Also, the material that the bulb is made of can absorb some of the germicidal rays. Lamp cooling under airflow can also lower UV output. The UV dose should be calculated using the end of lamp life (EOL is specified in number of hours when the lamp is expected to reach 80% of its initial UV output). Some shatter-proof lamps are coated with a fluorated ethylene polymer to contain glass shards and mercury in case of breakage; this coating reduces UV output by as much as 20%.

UV source intensity is sometimes specified as irradiance at a distance of 1 meter, which can be easily converted to radiant intensity. UV intensity is inversely proportional to the square of the distance so it decreases at longer distances. Alternatively, it rapidly increases at distances shorter than 1 m. In the above formula, the UV intensity must always be adjusted for distance unless the UV dose is calculated at exactly 1 m (3.3 ft) from the lamp. The UV dose should be calculated at the furthest distance from the lamp on the periphery of the target area. Increases in fluence can be achieved by using reflection, such that the same light passes through the medium several times before being absorbed. Aluminum has the highest reflectivity rate versus other metals and is recommended when using UV.

In static applications the exposure time can be as long as needed for an effective UV dose to be reached. In waterflow/airflow disinfection, exposure time can be increased by increasing the illuminated volume, decreasing the fluid speed, or recirculating the air or water repeatedly through the illuminated section. This ensures multiple passes so that the UV is effective against the highest number of microorganisms and will irradiate resistant microorganisms more than once to break them down.

=== Inactivation of microorganisms ===
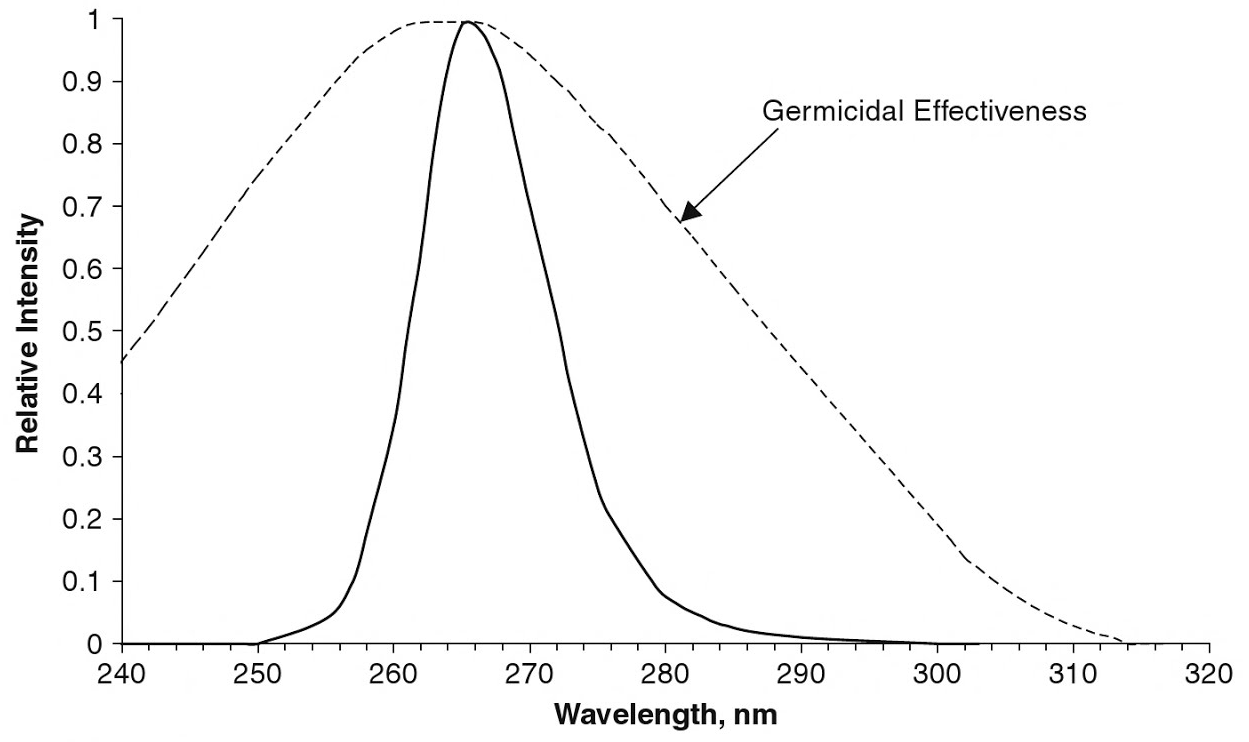
UVC LED emitting 265 nm compared to E. coli germicidal effectiveness curve.

Microbes are more susceptible to certain wavelengths of UV light, a function called the germicidal effectiveness curve. The curve for E. coli is given in the figure, with the most effective UV light having a wavelength of 265 nm. This applies to most bacteria and does not change significantly for other microbes. Dosages for a 90% kill rate of most bacteria and viruses range between 2,000 and 8,000 μJ/cm^{2}. Larger parasites such as Cryptosporidium require a lower dose for inactivation. As a result, US EPA has accepted UV disinfection as a method for drinking water plants to obtain Cryptosporidium, Giardia or virus inactivation credits. For example, for a 90% reduction of Cryptosporidium, a minimum dose of 2,500 μW·s/cm^{2} is required based on EPA's 2006 guidance manual.

Consumer litigation has challenged the practical efficacy of some UV-C features in household air purifiers. In the 2023 class-action lawsuit Felice v. Guardian Technologies LLC, plaintiffs alleged that the UV-C bulbs in GermGuardian devices provided no material antimicrobial benefit as airborne pathogens passed through the unit. A federal judge dismissed the complaint in 2024, but allowed for it to be amended.

"Sterilization" is often misquoted as being achievable. While it is theoretically possible in a controlled environment, it is very difficult to prove and the term "disinfection" is generally used by companies offering this service as to avoid legal reprimand. Specialist companies will often advertise a certain log reduction, e.g., 6-log reduction or 99.9999% effective, instead of sterilization. This takes into consideration a phenomenon known as light and dark repair (photoreactivation and base excision repair, respectively), in which a cell can repair DNA that has been damaged by UV light.

== Safety ==
Warning for optical radiation applies to devices that emit UV light.

=== Skin and eye safety ===
Many UVGI systems use UV wavelengths that can be harmful to humans, resulting in both immediate and long-term effects. Acute impacts on the eyes and skin can include conditions such as photokeratitis (often termed "snow blindness") and erythema (reddening of the skin), while chronic exposure may heighten the risk of skin cancer.

However, the safety and effects of UV vary extensively by wavelength, implying that not all UVGI systems pose the same level of hazards. Humans typically encounter UV light in the form of solar UV, which comprises significant portions of UV-A and UV-B, but excludes UV-C. The UV-B band, able to penetrate deep into living, replicating tissue, is recognized as the most damaging and carcinogenic.

Many standard UVGI systems, such as low-pressure mercury (LP-Hg) lamps, produce broad-band emissions in the UV-C range and also peaks in the UV-B band. This often makes it challenging to attribute damaging effects to a specific wavelength. Nevertheless, longer wavelengths in the UV-C band can cause conditions like photokeratitis and erythema. Hence, many UVGI systems are used in settings where direct human exposure is limited, such as with upper-room UVGI air cleaners and water disinfection systems.

Precautions are commonly implemented to protect users of these UVGI systems, including:

- Warning labels: Labels alert users to the dangers of UV light.
- Interlocking systems: Shielded systems, such as closed water tanks or air circulation units, often have interlocks that automatically shut off the UV lamps if the system is opened for human access. Clear viewports that block UV-C are also available.
- Personal protective equipment: Most protective eyewear, particularly those compliant with ANSI Z87.1, block UV-C. Similarly, clothing, plastics, and most types of glass (excluding fused silica) effectively impede UV-C.

Since the early 2010s there has been growing interest in the far-UVC wavelengths of 200-235 nm for whole-room exposure. These wavelengths are generally considered safer due to their limited penetration depth caused by increased protein absorption. This feature confines far-UVC exposure to the superficial layers of tissue, such as the outer layer of dead skin (the stratum corneum) and the tear film and surface cells of the cornea. As these tissues do not contain replicating cells, damage to them poses less carcinogenic risk. It has also been demonstrated that far-UVC does not cause erythema or damage to the cornea at levels many times that of solar UV or conventional 254 nm UVGI systems.

==== Exposure limits ====
Exposure limits for UV, particularly the germicidal UV-C range, have evolved over time due to scientific research and changing technology. The American Conference of Governmental Industrial Hygienists (ACGIH) and the International Commission on Non-Ionizing Radiation Protection (ICNIRP) have set exposure limits to safeguard against both immediate and long-term effects of UV exposure. These limits, also referred to as Threshold Limit Values (TLVs), form the basis for emission limits in product safety standards.

The UV-C photobiological spectral band is defined as 100–280 nm, with limits currently applying only from 180 to 280 nm. This reflects concerns about acute damage such as erythema and photokeratitis as well as long-term delayed effects like photocarcinogenesis. However, with the increased safety evidence surrounding UV-C for germicidal applications, the existing ACGIH TLVs were revised in 2022.

The TLVs for the 222 nm UV-C wavelength (peak emissions from KrCl excimer lamps), following the 2022 revision, are now 161 mJ/cm^{2} for eye exposure and 479 mJ/cm^{2} for skin exposure over an eight-hour period. For the 254 nm UV wavelength, the updated exposure limit is now set at 6 mJ/cm^{2} for eyes and 10 mJ/cm^{2} for skin.

=== Indoor air chemistry ===
UV can influence indoor air chemistry, leading to the formation of ozone and other potentially harmful pollutants, including particulate pollution. This occurs primarily through photolysis, where UV photons break molecules into smaller radicals that form radicals such as OH. The radicals can react with volatile organic compounds (VOCs) to produce oxidized VOCs (OVOCs) and secondary organic aerosols (SOA).

Wavelengths below 242 nm can also generate ozone, which not only contributes to OVOCs and SOA formation but can be harmful in itself. When inhaled in high quantities, these pollutants can irritate the eyes and respiratory system and exacerbate conditions like asthma.

The specific pollutants produced depend on the initial air chemistry and the UV source power and wavelength. To control ozone and other indoor pollutants, ventilation and filtration methods are used, diluting airborne pollutants and maintaining indoor air quality.

=== Polymer damage ===
UVC radiation is able to break chemical bonds. This leads to rapid aging of plastics and other material, and insulation and gaskets. Plastics sold as "UV-resistant" are tested only for the lower-energy UVB since UVC does not normally reach the surface of the Earth. When UVC is used near plastic, rubber, or insulation, these materials may be protected by metal tape or aluminum foil.

== Applications ==
=== Air disinfection ===
UVGI can be used to disinfect air with prolonged exposure. In the 1930s and 40s, an experiment in public schools in Philadelphia showed that upper-room ultraviolet fixtures could significantly reduce the transmission of measles among students.

UV and violet light are able to neutralize the infectivity of SARS-CoV-2. Viral titers usually found in the sputum of COVID-19 patients are completely inactivated by levels of UV-A and UV-B irradiation that are similar to those levels experienced from natural sun exposure. This finding suggests that the reduced incidence of SARS-COV-2 in the summer may be, in part, due to the neutralizing activity of solar UV irradiation.

Various UV-emitting devices can be used for SARS-CoV-2 disinfection, and these devices may help in reducing the spread of infection. SARS-CoV-2 can be inactivated by a wide range of UVC wavelengths, and the wavelength of 222 nm provides the most effective disinfection performance.

Disinfection is a function of UV intensity and time. For this reason, it is in theory not as effective on moving air, or when the lamp is perpendicular to the flow, as exposure times are dramatically reduced. However, numerous professional and scientific publications have indicated that the overall effectiveness of UVGI actually increases when used in conjunction with fans and HVAC ventilation, which facilitate whole-room circulation that exposes more air to the UV source. Air purification UVGI systems can be free-standing units with shielded UV lamps that use a fan to force air past the UV light. Other systems are installed in forced air systems so that the circulation for the premises moves microorganisms past the lamps. Key to this form of sterilization is placement of the UV lamps and a good filtration system to remove the dead microorganisms. For example, forced air systems by design impede line-of-sight, thus creating areas of the environment that will be shaded from the UV light. However, a UV lamp placed at the coils and drain pans of cooling systems will keep microorganisms from forming in these naturally damp places.

=== Water disinfection ===
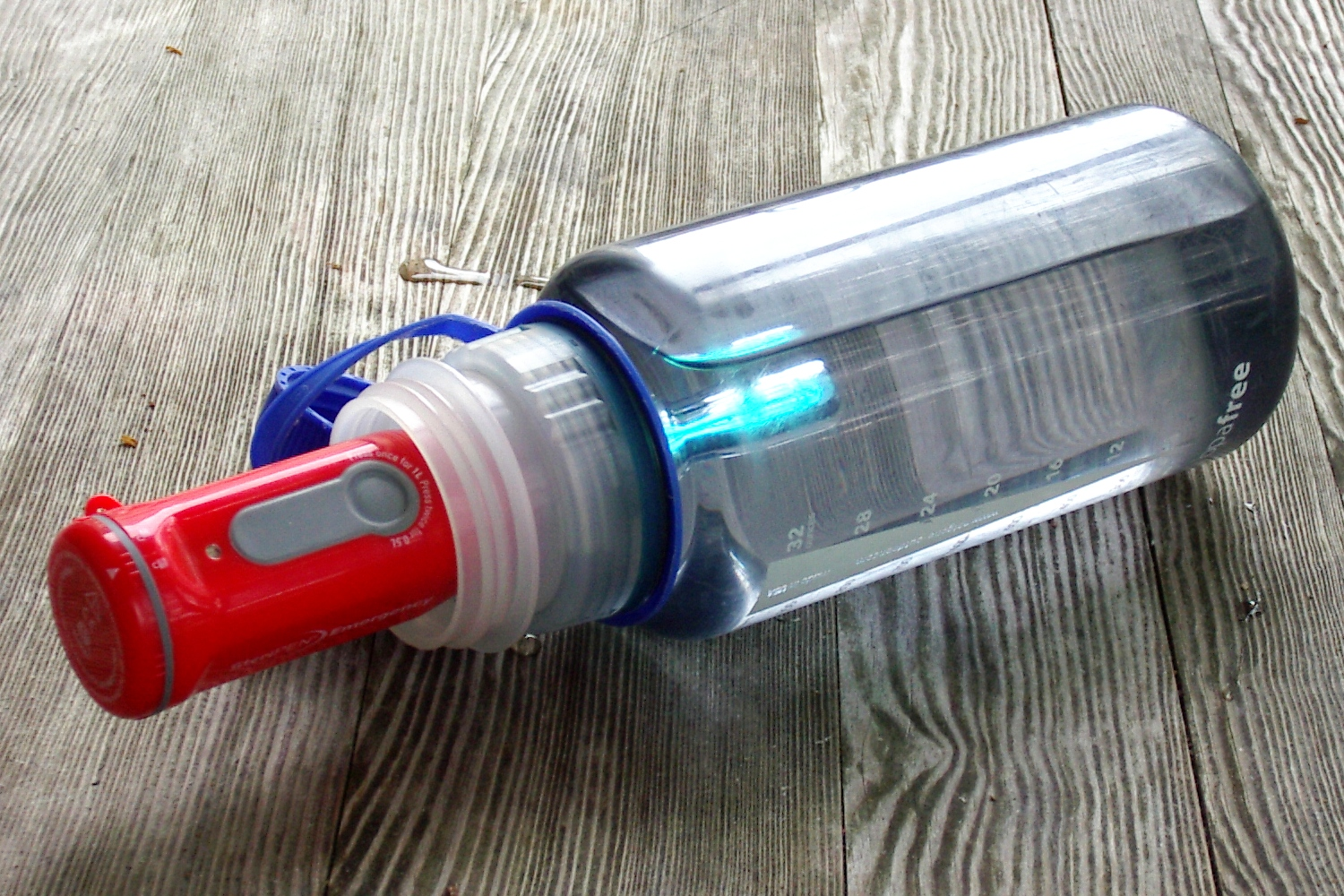
A portable, battery-powered, low-pressure mercury-vapour discharge lamp for water sterilization

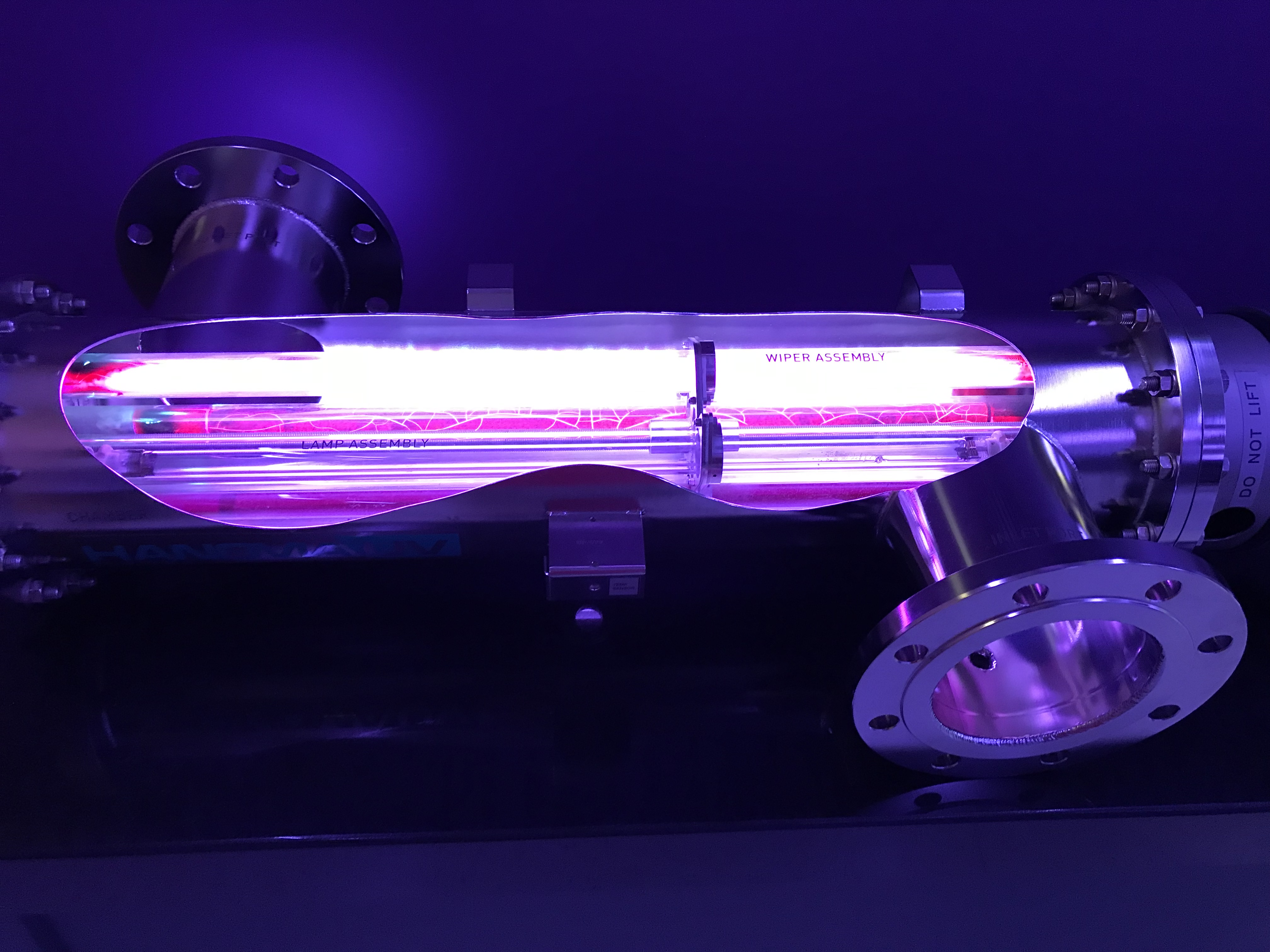
Cutaway model of UV disinfection unit used in water treatment plants

Ultraviolet disinfection of water is a purely physical, chemical-free process. Even parasites such as Cryptosporidium or Giardia, which are extremely resistant to chemical disinfectants, are efficiently reduced. UV can also be used to remove chlorine and chloramine species from water; this process is called photolysis, and requires a higher dose than normal disinfection. The dead microorganisms are not removed from the water. UV disinfection does not remove dissolved organics, inorganic compounds or particles in the water. The world's largest water disinfection plant treats drinking water for New York City. The Catskill-Delaware Water Ultraviolet Disinfection Facility, commissioned on 8 October 2013, incorporates a total of 56 energy-efficient UV reactors treating up to 2.2 billion U.S. gallons (8.3 billion liters) a day.

Ultraviolet can also be combined with ozone or hydrogen peroxide to produce hydroxyl radicals to break down trace contaminants through an advanced oxidation process.

It used to be thought that UV disinfection was more effective for bacteria and viruses, which have more-exposed genetic material, than for larger pathogens that have outer coatings or that form cyst states (e.g., Giardia) that shield their DNA from UV light. However, it was recently discovered that ultraviolet radiation can be somewhat effective for treating the microorganism Cryptosporidium. The findings resulted in the use of UV radiation as a viable method to treat drinking water. Giardia in turn has been shown to be very susceptible to UV-C when the tests were based on infectivity rather than excystation. It has been found that protists are able to survive high UV-C doses but are sterilized at low doses.

UV water treatment devices can be used for well water and surface water disinfection. UV treatment compares favourably with other water disinfection systems in terms of cost, labour and the need for technically trained personnel for operation. Water chlorination treats larger organisms and offers residual disinfection, but these systems are expensive because they need special operator training and a steady supply of a potentially hazardous material. Finally, boiling of water is the most reliable treatment method but it demands labour and imposes a high economic cost. UV treatment is rapid and, in terms of primary energy use, approximately 20,000 times more efficient than boiling.

UV disinfection is most effective for treating high-clarity, purified reverse osmosis distilled water. Suspended particles are a problem because microorganisms buried within particles are shielded from the UV light and pass through the unit unaffected. However, UV systems can be coupled with a pre-filter to remove those larger organisms that would otherwise pass through the UV system unaffected. The pre-filter also clarifies the water to improve light transmittance and therefore UV dose throughout the entire water column. Another key factor of UV water treatment is the flow rate—if the flow is too high, water will pass through without sufficient UV exposure. If the flow is too low, heat may build up and damage the UV lamp. A disadvantage of UVGI is that while water treated by chlorination is resistant to reinfection (until the chlorine off-gasses), UVGI water is not resistant to reinfection. UVGI water must be transported or delivered in such a way as to avoid reinfection.

A 2006 project at University of California, Berkeley produced a design for inexpensive water disinfection in resource deprived settings. The project was designed to produce an open source design that could be adapted to meet local conditions. In a somewhat similar proposal in 2014, Australian students designed a system using potato chip (crisp) packet foil to reflect solar UV radiation into a glass tube that disinfects water without power.

==== Modeling ====
Sizing of a UV system is affected by three variables: flow rate, lamp power, and UV transmittance in the water. Manufacturers typically developed sophisticated computational fluid dynamics (CFD) models validated with bioassay testing. This involves testing the UV reactor's disinfection performance with either MS2 or T1 bacteriophages at various flow rates, UV transmittance, and power levels in order to develop a regression model for system sizing. For example, this is a requirement for all public water systems in the United States per the EPA UV manual.

The flow profile is produced from the chamber geometry, flow rate, and particular turbulence model selected. The radiation profile is developed from inputs such as water quality, lamp type (power, germicidal efficiency, spectral output, arc length), and the transmittance and dimension of the quartz sleeve. Proprietary CFD software simulates both the flow and radiation profiles. Once the 3D model of the chamber is built, it is populated with a grid or mesh that comprises thousands of small cubes.

Points of interest—such as at a bend, on the quartz sleeve surface, or around the wiper mechanism—use a higher resolution mesh, whilst other areas within the reactor use a coarse mesh. Once the mesh is produced, hundreds of thousands of virtual particles are "fired" through the chamber. Each particle has several variables of interest associated with it, and the particles are "harvested" after the reactor. Discrete phase modeling produces delivered dose, head loss, and other chamber-specific parameters.

When the modeling phase is complete, selected systems are validated using a professional third party to provide oversight and to determine how closely the model is able to predict the reality of system performance. System validation uses non-pathogenic surrogates such as MS 2 phage or Bacillus subtilis to determine the Reduction Equivalent Dose (RED) ability of the reactors. Most systems are validated to deliver 40 mJ/cm^{2} within an envelope of flow and transmittance.

To validate effectiveness in drinking water systems, the method described in the EPA UV guidance manual is typically used by US water utilities, whilst Europe has adopted Germany's DVGW 294 standard. For wastewater systems, the NWRI/AwwaRF Ultraviolet Disinfection Guidelines for Drinking Water and Water Reuse protocols are typically used, especially in wastewater reuse applications.

=== Wastewater treatment ===
Ultraviolet in sewage treatment is commonly replacing chlorination. This is in large part because of concerns that reaction of the chlorine with organic compounds in the waste water stream could synthesize potentially toxic and long lasting chlorinated organics and also because of the environmental risks of storing chlorine gas or chlorine containing chemicals. Individual wastestreams to be treated by UVGI must be tested to ensure that the method will be effective due to potential interferences such as suspended solids, dyes, or other substances that may block or absorb the UV radiation. According to the World Health Organization, "UV units to treat small batches (1 to several liters) or low flows (1 to several liters per minute) of water at the community level are estimated to have costs of US$20 per megaliter, including the cost of electricity and consumables and the annualized capital cost of the unit."

Large-scale urban UV wastewater treatment is performed in cities such as Edmonton, Alberta. The use of ultraviolet light has now become standard practice in most municipal wastewater treatment processes. Effluent is now starting to be recognized as a valuable resource, not a problem that needs to be dumped. Many wastewater facilities are being renamed as water reclamation facilities, whether the wastewater is discharged into a river, used to irrigate crops, or injected into an aquifer for later recovery. Ultraviolet light is now being used to ensure water is free from harmful organisms.

=== Aquarium and pond ===
Ultraviolet sterilizers are often used to help control unwanted microorganisms in aquaria and ponds. UV irradiation ensures that pathogens cannot reproduce, thus decreasing the likelihood of a disease outbreak in an aquarium.

Aquarium and pond sterilizers are typically small, with fittings for tubing that allows the water to flow through the sterilizer on its way from a separate external filter or water pump. Within the sterilizer, water flows as close as possible to the ultraviolet light source. Water pre-filtration is critical as water turbidity lowers UV-C penetration. Many of the better UV sterilizers have long dwell times and limit the space between the UV-C source and the inside wall of the UV sterilizer device.

=== Laboratory hygiene ===
UVGI is often used to disinfect equipment such as safety goggles, instruments, pipettors, and other devices. Lab personnel also disinfect glassware and plasticware this way. Microbiology laboratories use UVGI to disinfect surfaces inside biological safety cabinets ("hoods") between uses.

=== Food and beverage protection ===
Since the U.S. Food and Drug Administration issued a rule in 2001 requiring that virtually all fruit and vegetable juice producers follow HACCP controls, and mandating a 5-log reduction in pathogens, UVGI has seen some use in sterilization of juices such as fresh-pressed.

== UV Sources ==
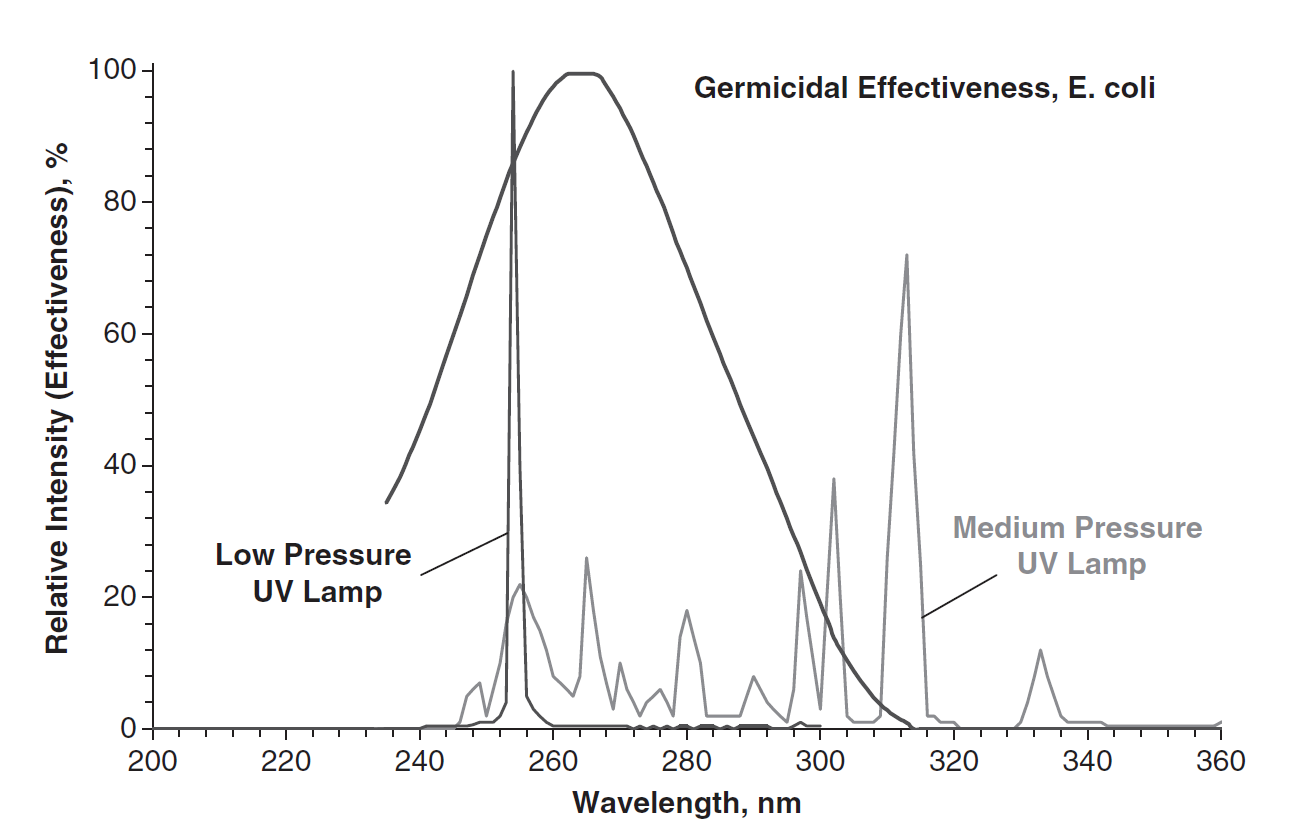
Low-pressure & medium-pressure mercury-vapor lamp compared to E. coli germicidal effectiveness curve.

=== Mercury vapor lamps ===
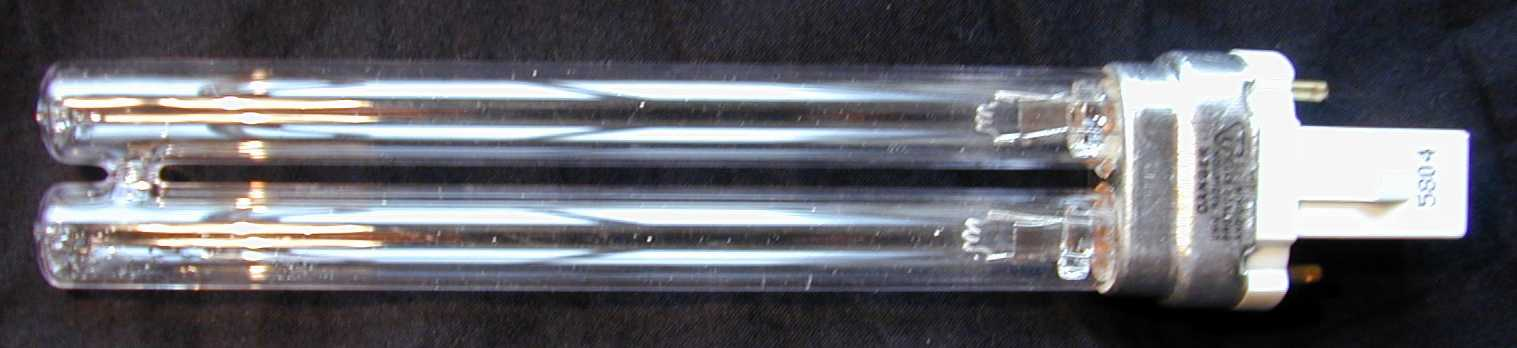
A 9 W germicidal lamp in a compact fluorescent lamp form factor

Germicidal UV for disinfection is most typically generated by a mercury-vapor lamp. Low-pressure mercury vapor has a strong emission line at 254 nm, which is within the range of wavelengths that demonstrate strong disinfection effect. The optimal wavelengths for disinfection are close to 260 nm.

Mercury vapor lamps may be categorized as either low-pressure (including amalgam) or medium-pressure lamps. Low-pressure UV lamps offer high efficiencies (approx. 35% UV-C) but lower power, typically 1 W/cm power density (power per unit of arc length). Amalgam UV lamps utilize an amalgam to control mercury pressure to allow operation at a somewhat higher temperature and power density. They operate at higher temperatures and have a lifetime of up to 16,000 hours. Their efficiency is slightly lower than that of traditional low-pressure lamps (approx. 33% UV-C output), and power density is approximately 2–3 W/cm^{3}. Medium-pressure UV lamps operate at much higher temperatures, up to about 800 degrees Celsius, and have a polychromatic output spectrum and a high radiation output but lower UV-C efficiency of 10% or less. Typical power density is 30 W/cm^{3} or greater.

Depending on the quartz glass used for the lamp body, low-pressure and amalgam UV emit radiation at 254 nm and also at 185 nm, which has chemical effects. UV radiation at 185 nm is used to generate ozone.

The UV lamps for water treatment consist of specialized low-pressure mercury-vapor lamps that produce ultraviolet radiation at 254 nm, or medium-pressure UV lamps that produce a polychromatic output from 200 nm to visible and infrared energy. The UV lamp never contacts the water; it is either housed in a quartz glass sleeve inside the water chamber or mounted externally to the water, which flows through the transparent UV tube. Water passing through the flow chamber is exposed to UV rays, which are absorbed by suspended solids, such as microorganisms and dirt, in the stream.

=== LEDs ===
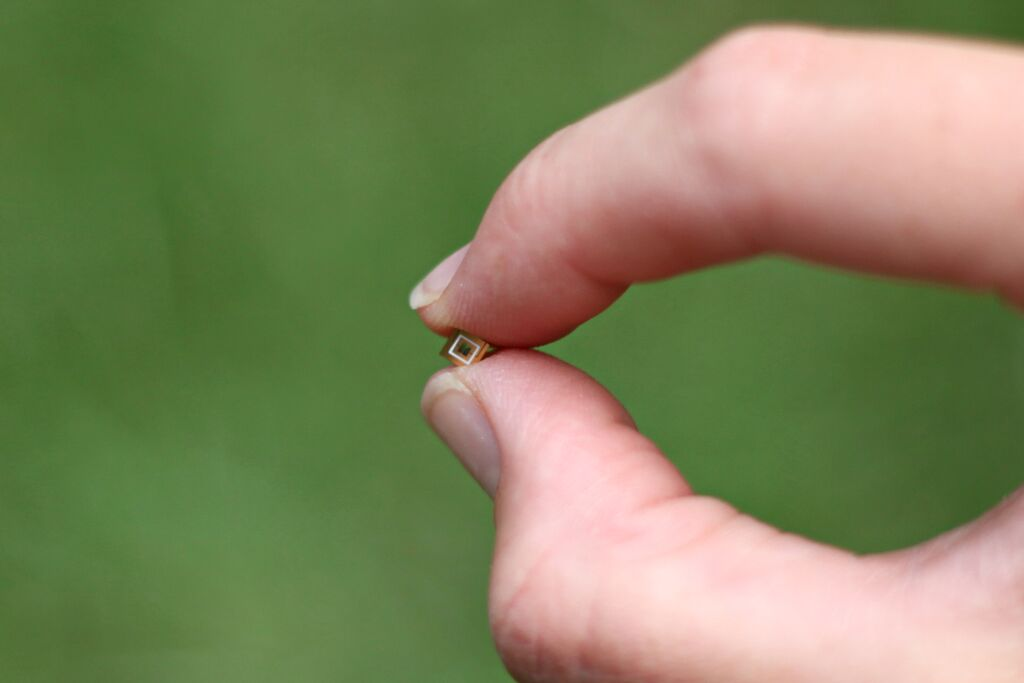
Compact and versatile options with UV-C LEDs

Recent developments in LED technology have led to commercially available UV-C LEDs. UV-C LEDs use semiconductors to emit light between 255 nm and 280 nm. The wavelength emission is tuneable by adjusting the material of the semiconductor. As of 2019, the electrical-to-UV-C conversion efficiency of LEDs was lower than that of mercury lamps. The reduced size of LEDs opens up options for small reactor systems allowing for point-of-use applications and integration into medical devices. The low power consumption of semiconductors has enabled UV disinfection systems powered by small solar cells to be deployed in remote or under-resourced regions.

UV-C LEDs don't necessarily last longer than traditional germicidal lamps in terms of hours used, instead having more-variable engineering characteristics and better tolerance for short-term operation. A UV-C LED can achieve a longer installed time than a traditional germicidal lamp in intermittent use. Likewise, LED degradation increases with heat, while filament and HID lamp output wavelength is dependent on temperature, so engineers can design LEDs of a particular size and cost to have a higher output and faster degradation or a lower output and slower decline over time.

== See also ==
- HEPA filter
- Portable water purification
- Sanitation
- Sanitation Standard Operating Procedures
- Solar water disinfection
