= Cyanovirin-N =

Protein

Cyanovirin-N (CV-N) is a protein produced by the cyanobacterium Nostoc ellipsosporum that displays virucidal activity against several viruses, including human immunodeficiency virus (HIV). The cyanobacterial protein has strong anti-HIV neutralizing properties. The virucidal activity of CV-N is mediated through specific high-affinity interactions with the viral surface envelope glycoproteins gp120 and gp41, as well as high-mannose oligosaccharides found on the HIV envelope. In addition, CV-N is active against rhinoviruses, human parainfluenza virus, respiratory syncytial virus, and enteric viruses. The virucidal activity of CV-N against influenza virus is directed towards viral haemagglutinin.

The blue-green alga Nostoc ellipsosporum naturally contains CV-N. The National Cancer Institute (NCI) in the United States of America carried out the initial isolation and characterization of this protein in 1999. The use of CV-N as an antiviral drug, particularly against HIV, has since been the subject of investigation. Its ability to bind to the HIV-encapsulating glycoprotein gp120 has been demonstrated in several studies, which has led to the development of CV-N-based therapies and preventatives.

== Structure ==
CV-N is a lengthy, mostly beta-sheet protein that displays internal two-fold pseudosymmetry. The fundamental atomic root-mean-square of the two sequence repeats (1-50 and 51-101) differs by 1.3 Å while sharing 32% of the same sequence. The total fold depends on a number of interactions between the two repetitions; therefore, they do not actually belong in separate domains. CV-N has a complex fold of a tandem repeat duplication of two homologous motifs, comprising three-stranded beta-sheet and beta-hairpins.
