= List of Intel processors =

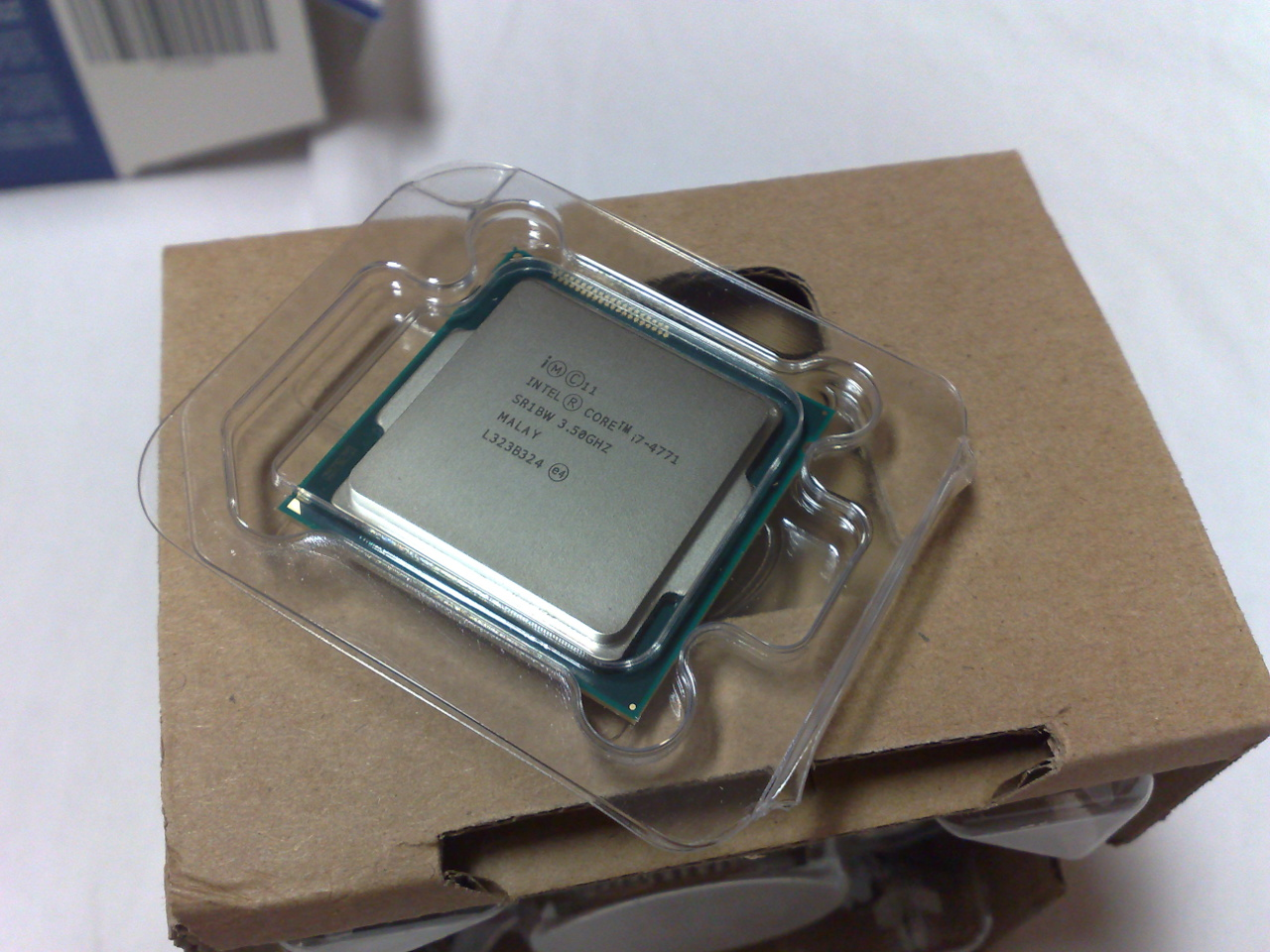
Intel Haswell Core i7-4771 CPU, sitting atop its original packaging that contains an OEM fan-cooled heatsink

Release timeline x86 Desktop processors
1978	Intel 8086
1979	Intel 8088
1980
1981
1982	Intel 80186
1982	Intel 80286
1983
1984
1985	Intel386 DX
1986
1987
1988	Intel386 SX
1989	Intel486 DX
1990
1991	Intel486 SX
1992	Intel486 DX2
1993	Pentium (P5)
1994	Intel486 DX4
1994	Pentium (P54C)
1995	Pentium (P54CQS)
1995	Pentium (P54CS)
1995	Pentium Pro (P6)
1996
1997	Pentium MMX (P55C)
1997	Pentium II (Klamath)
1998	Pentium II (Deschutes)
1999	Pentium III (Katmai)
1999	Pentium III (Coppermine)
2000	Pentium 4 (Willamette)
2001	Pentium III (Tualatin)
2002	Pentium 4 (Northwood)
2003
2004	Pentium 4 (Prescott)
2005	Pentium D (Smithsfield)
2006	Pentium 4 (Cedar Mill)
2006	Pentium D (Presler)
2006	Core 2 (Conroe)
2007	Core 2 (Penryn)
2008	Core i 1st generation (Nehalem)
2009
2010	Core i 1st generation (Westmere)
2011	Core i 2nd generation (Sandy Bridge)
2012	Core i 3rd generation (Ivy Bridge)
2013	Core i 4th generation (Haswell)
2014
2015	Core i 5th generation (Broadwell)
2015	Core i 6th generation (Skylake)
2016
2017	Core i 7th generation (Kaby Lake)
2017	Core i 8th generation (Coffee Lake)
2018	Core i 9th generation (Coffee Lake)
2019
2020	Core i 10th generation (Comet Lake)
2021	Core i 11th generation (Rocket Lake)
2022	Core i 12th generation (Alder Lake)
2023	Core i 13th generation (Raptor Lake)
2023	Core i 14th generation (Raptor Lake)
2023	Core Series 1 (Meteor Lake)
2024	Core Ultra Series 2 (Arrow Lake)
2025
2026	Core Series 3 (Panther Lake)
2026	Core Series 2 Plus (Arrow Lake)

This list of Intel processors by generation attempts to present all of Intel's processors from the 4-bit 4004 (1971) to the present high-end offerings. Concise technical data is given for each product.

== Latest ==
=== Xeon 6+ ===
Released at Computex 2026 on June 1, 2026. Codenamed Clearwater Forest, it is designed for network infrastructure and data center servers. It supports up to 1.5 TB of DDR5 RDIMM 8000MT/s RAM and ECC memory.

==== Accelerated Processor Server ====
Underlined models support Intel Speed Select. All models are E-Core only.

Xeon 6900E+ Series (Codenamed "Clearwater Forest-AP")
Processor Family	Model	Cores	Configuration		Clock rate (GHz)		Cache	Max. Scalability	Memory Support		TDP	Release date
Processor Family	Model	Cores	Tiles	Core Config	Base	Turbo	Cache	Max. Scalability	Memory speed	Memory channels	TDP	Release date
Xeon 6+	6990E+	288 (288)	12x Compute tile 3x Active base tile 2x I/O tile 12x EMIB tile	12x 24	2.2	3.2	576 MB	2S	DDR5-8000 RDIMM	12	450 W	June 1, 2026
Xeon 6+	6980E+	264 (264)	11x Compute tile 3x Active base tile 2x I/O tile 11x EMIB tile	11x 24	2.1	3.2	528 MB	2S	DDR5-8000 RDIMM	12	400 W	June 1, 2026
Xeon 6+	6970E+	192 (192)	8x Compute tile 3x Active base tile 2x I/O tile 8x EMIB tile	8x 24	2.3	3.2	480 MB	2S	DDR5-8000 RDIMM	12	400 W	June 1, 2026
Xeon 6+	6960E+	144 (144)	6x Compute tile 3x Active base tile 2x I/O tile 6x EMIB tile	6x 24	2.4	3.2	432 MB	2S	DDR5-8000 RDIMM	12	330 W	June 1, 2026

=== Core Series 3 ===
Announced at CES 2026 on January 5, 2026. Codenamed Panther Lake, which only includes mobile processors and handheld gaming processors.

==== Mobile processors ====
===== Premium =====
====== High Power ======
Underlined models support Intel vPRO.

Core Ultra 300H Series (codenamed "Panther Lake High Power")
Branding	SKU	Cores				Clock rate (GHz)						Arc Graphics			NPU (TOPS)	Cache				Power		Released
Branding	SKU	Cores				Base			Turbo			Arc Graphics			NPU (TOPS)	Cache				Power		Released
Branding	SKU	P	E	LP-E	Total	P	E	LP-E	P	E	LP-E	Branding	X^{e} Cores (VE:RT)	Clock (GHz)	NPU (TOPS)	L0	L1	L2	L3	Base	Turbo	Released
Core Ultra X9	388H	4	8	4	16	2.1	1.6		5.1	3.8	3.7	Intel Arc B390	12 (96:12)	2.5	50	192 KB	2.2 MB	22 MB	18 MB	25 W	80 W	January 5, 2026
Core Ultra X9	378H	4	8	4	16	2	1.6		5	3.8	3.6	Intel Arc B390	12 (96:12)	2.5	50	192 KB	2.2 MB	22 MB	18 MB	25 W	80 W	April 4, 2026
Core Ultra X7	368H	4	8	4	16	2	1.6		5	3.8	3.6	Intel Arc B390	12 (96:12)	2.5	50	192 KB	2.2 MB	22 MB	18 MB	25 W	80 W	January 5, 2026
Core Ultra X7	358H	4	8	4	16	1.9	1.5		4.8	3.5	3.3	Intel Arc B390	12 (96:12)	2.5	50	192 KB	2.2 MB	22 MB	18 MB	25 W	80 W	January 5, 2026
Core Ultra 9	386H	4	8	4	16	2.1	1.6		4.9	3.7	3.5	Intel Graphics	4 (32:4)	2.5	50	192 KB	2.2 MB	22 MB	18 MB	25 W	80 W	January 5, 2026
Core Ultra 7	366H	4	8	4	16	2	1.6		4.8	3.6	3.4	Intel Graphics	4 (32:4)	2.5	50	192 KB	2.2 MB	22 MB	18 MB	25 W	80 W	January 5, 2026
Core Ultra 7	356H	4	8	4	16	1.9	1.5		4.7	3.5	3.3	Intel Graphics	4 (32:4)	2.45	50	192 KB	2.2 MB	22 MB	18 MB	25 W	80 W	January 5, 2026
Core Ultra 5	338H	4	4	4	12	1.9	1.5		4.7	3.4	3.3	Intel Arc B370	10 (80:10)	2.4	47	192 KB	1.8 MB	18 MB	18 MB	25 W	65 W	January 5, 2026
Core Ultra 5	336H	4	4	4	12	1.9	1.5		4.6	3.4	3.2	Intel Graphics	4 (32:4)	2.3	47	192 KB	1.8 MB	18 MB	18 MB	25 W	65 W	January 5, 2026

====== Low Power ======
Underlined models support Intel vPRO.

Core Ultra 300 Series (codenamed "Panther Lake")
Branding	SKU	Cores			Clock rate (GHz)				Arc Graphics			NPU (TOPS)	Cache				Power		Released
Branding	SKU	Cores			Base		Turbo		Arc Graphics			NPU (TOPS)	Cache				Power		Released
Branding	SKU	P	LP-E	Total	P	LP-E	P	LP-E	Branding	X^{e} Cores (VE:RT)	Clock (GHz)	NPU (TOPS)	L0	L1	L2	L3	Base	Turbo	Released
Core Ultra 7	365	4	4	8	2.4	1.8	4.8	3.6	Intel Graphics	4 (32:4)	2.5	49	192 KB	1.4 MB	14 MB	12 MB	25 W	55 W	January 5, 2026
Core Ultra 7	355	4	4	8	2.3	1.7	4.7	3.5	Intel Graphics	4 (32:4)	2.45	49	192 KB	1.4 MB	14 MB	12 MB	25 W	55 W	January 5, 2026
Core Ultra 5	335	4	4	8	2.2	1.6	4.6	3.4	Intel Graphics	4 (32:4)	3.4	47	192 KB	1.4 MB	14 MB	12 MB	25 W	55 W	January 5, 2026
Core Ultra 5	332	2	4	6	1.6	1.9	4.4	3.3	Intel Graphics	4 (32:4)	2.3	46	96 KB	896 KB	9 MB	12 MB	25 W	55 W	January 5, 2026
Core Ultra 5	325	4	4	8	2.1	1.6	4.5	3.4	Intel Graphics	4 (32:4)	2.45	47	192 KB	1.4 MB	14 MB	12 MB	25 W	55 W	January 5, 2026
Core Ultra 5	322	2	4	6	2.5	1.9	4.4	3.3	Intel Graphics	4 (32:4)	2.3	46	96 KB	896 KB	9 MB	12 MB	25 W	55 W	January 5, 2026

===== Value =====
====== Low Power ======
Italic models are in Intel SIPP (Stable IT Platform Program).

Core 300 Series (codenamed "Wildcat Lake")
Branding	SKU	Cores			Clock rate (GHz)				Arc Graphics		NPU (TOPS)	Cache				Power		Released	Price (USD)
Branding	SKU	Cores			Base		Turbo		Arc Graphics		NPU (TOPS)	Cache				Power		Released	Price (USD)
Branding	SKU	P	LP-E	Total	P	LP-E	P	LP-E	X^{e} Cores (VE:RT)	Clock (GHz)	NPU (TOPS)	L0	L1	L2	L3	Base	Turbo	Released	Price (USD)
Core 7	360	2	4	6	1.5	1.4	4.8	3.6	2 (16:2)	2.6	17	96 KB	896 KB	9 MB	6 MB	15 W	35 W	April 16, 2026	$426
Core 7	350	2	4	6	1.5	1.4	4.8	3.6	2 (16:2)	2.6	17	96 KB	896 KB	9 MB	6 MB	15 W	35 W	April 16, 2026	$469
Core 5	330	2	4	6	1.5	1.4	4.6	3.4	2 (16:2)	2.5	16	96 KB	896 KB	9 MB	6 MB	15 W	35 W	April 16, 2026	$309
Core 5	320	2	4	6	1.5	1.4	4.6	3.4	2 (16:2)	2.5	16	96 KB	896 KB	9 MB	6 MB	15 W	35 W	April 16, 2026	$340
Core 5	315	2	4	6	1.5	1.4	4.4	3.3	2 (16:2)	2.3	15	96 KB	896 KB	9 MB	6 MB	15 W	35 W	April 16, 2026	$340
Core 3	305	2	4	6	1.5	1.4	4.3	3.3	1 (8:1)	2.3	15	96 KB	896 KB	9 MB	6 MB	15 W	35 W	April 16, 2026	$309
Core 3	304	1	4	5	1.5	1.4	4.3	3.3	1 (8:1)	2.3	15	48 KB	640 KB	6.5 MB	6 MB	15 W	35 W	April 16, 2026	$309

==== Handheld Gaming ====
Arc G3 Series (codenamed "Panther Lake")
Branding	SKU	Cores				Clock rate (GHz)						Arc Graphics			NPU (TOPS)	Cache				Power		Released
Branding	SKU	Cores				Base			Turbo			Arc Graphics			NPU (TOPS)	Cache				Power		Released
Branding	SKU	P	E	LP-E	Total	P	E	LP-E	P	E	LP-E	Branding	X^{e} Cores (VE:RT)	Clock (GHz)	NPU (TOPS)	L0	L1	L2	L3	Base	Turbo	Released
Arc	G3 EXTREME	2	8	4	14	1.9	1.5		4.7	3.4	3.1	Intel Arc B390	12 (96:12)	2.3	46	96 KB	1.25 MB	13 MB	6 MB	25 W	80 W	May 28, 2026
Arc	G3	2	8	4	14	1.9	1.5		4.6	3.3	3.1	Intel Arc B370	10 (80:10)	2.2	46	96 KB	1.25 MB	13 MB	6 MB	25 W	80 W	May 28, 2026

=== Core Series 2 Plus ===
Released on March 26, 2026 as Arrow Lake Refresh.

==== Desktop ====
Socket LGA 1851

Core Ultra 200S Plus Series (Codenamed "Arrow Lake-S Refresh")
Branding	SKU	Cores			Clock rate (GHz)				Arc Graphics		TOPS (Int8)		Cache				Power		Released	Price (USD)
Branding	SKU	Cores			Base		Turbo		Arc Graphics		TOPS (Int8)		Cache				Power		Released	Price (USD)
Branding	SKU	P	E	Total	P	E	P	E	X^{e} Cores (VE:RT)	Clock (GHz)	NPU	Total	L0	L1	L2	L3	Base	Turbo	Released	Price (USD)
Core Ultra 7	270K Plus	8	16	24	3.7	3.2	5.5	4.7	4 (64:4)	2.0	13	36	384 KB	3.5 MB	40 MB	36 MB	125 W	250 W	March 26, 2026	$299
Core Ultra 5	250K Plus	6	12	18	4.2	3.3	5.3	4.6	4 (64:4)	1.9	13	30	288 KB	2.6 MB	30 MB	30 MB	125 W	159 W	March 26, 2026	$199
Core Ultra 5	250KF Plus	6	12	18	4.2	3.3	5.3	4.6	—N/a		13	22	288 KB	2.6 MB	30 MB	30 MB	125 W	159 W	March 26, 2026	$184

==== Mobile ====
===== Premium =====
====== Repurposed Desktop ======
Core Ultra 200HX Plus Series (Codenamed "Arrow Lake-HX Refresh")
Branding	SKU	Cores			Clock rate (GHz)				Arc Graphics		TOPS (Int8)		Cache		Power		Released	Price (USD)
Branding	SKU	Cores			Base		Turbo		Arc Graphics		TOPS (Int8)		Cache		Power		Released	Price (USD)
Branding	SKU	P	E	Total	P	E	P	E	X^{e} Cores (VE:RT)	Clock (GHz)	NPU	Total	L2	L3	Base	Turbo	Released	Price (USD)
Core Ultra 9	290HX Plus	8	16	24	2.7	1.8	5.5	4.7	4 (64:4)	2.0	13	36	40 MB	36 MB	55 W	160 W	January 6, 2025	
Core Ultra 7	270HX Plus	8	12	20	2.4	1.8	5.3	4.7	4 (64:4)	1.9	13	36	40 MB	36 MB	55 W	160 W	January 6, 2025	

=== Core Series 2 ===
Released on October 24, 2024. The Core Series 2 succeeded Meteor Lake, seeing Intel move from monolithic silicon to a disaggregated MCM design. Meteor Lake was limited to a mobile release while Arrow Lake includes desktop processors and mobile processors. Arrow Lake and Lunar Lake both do not support Hyper-Threading.

==== Desktop ====
Socket LGA 1851. Underlined models support Intel vPRO with the Q870 (enterprise) and W880 (entry-level workstation) chipsets, and ECC memory only on the W880 chipset.

Core Ultra 200S Series codenamed ("Arrow Lake-S")
Processor Family	Model	Cores (threads)			Clock rate (GHz)				Arc Graphics		TOPS (Int8)		Cache				TDP		Released	Price (USD)
Processor Family	Model	Cores (threads)			Base		Turbo		Arc Graphics		TOPS (Int8)		Cache				TDP		Released	Price (USD)
Processor Family	Model	P	E	Total	P	E	P	E	X^{e} Cores (VE:RT)	Clock (GHz)	NPU	Total	L0	L1	L2	L3	Base	Turbo	Released	Price (USD)
Core Ultra 9	285K	8	16	24	3.7	3.2	5.7	4.6	4 (64:4)	2.0	13	36	2.6 MB	3 MB	40 MB	36 MB	125 W	250 W	October 6, 2025	$589
Core Ultra 9	285	8	16	24	2.5	1.9	5.4	4.6	4 (64:4)	2.0	13	36	2.6 MB	3 MB	40 MB	36 MB	65 W	182 W	January 6, 2025	$549
Core Ultra 9	285T	8	16	24	1.4	1.2	5.3	4.6	4 (64:4)	2.0	13	35	2.6 MB	3 MB	40 MB	36 MB	35 W	112 W	January 6, 2025	$549
Core Ultra 7	265K	8	12	20	3.9	3.3	5.5	4.6	4 (64:4)	2.0	13	33	2.2 MB	2.7 MB	36 MB	30 MB	125 W	250 W	October 24, 2025	$394
Core Ultra 7	265KF	8	12	20	3.9	3.3	5.5	4.6	—N/a		13	25	2.2 MB	2.7 MB	36 MB	30 MB	125 W	250 W	October 24, 2025	$379
Core Ultra 7	265	8	12	20	2.4	1.8	5.2	4.6	4 (64:4)	1.95	13	33	2.2 MB	2.7 MB	36 MB	30 MB	65 W	182 W	January 6, 2025	$384
Core Ultra 7	265F	8	12	20	2.4	1.8	5.2	4.6	—N/a		13	25	2.2 MB	2.7 MB	36 MB	30 MB	65 W	182 W	January 6, 2025	$369
Core Ultra 7	265T	8	12	20	1.5	1.2	5.2	4.6	4 (64:4)	1.95	13	33	2.2 MB	2.7 MB	36 MB	30 MB	35 W	112 W	January 6, 2025	$384
Core Ultra 5	245K	6	8	14	4.2	3.6	5.2	4.6	4 (64:4)	1.9	13	30	288 KB	2.6 MB	24 MB	24 MB	125 W	159 W	October 24, 2025	$309
Core Ultra 5	245KF	6	8	14	4.2	3.6	5.2	4.6	—N/a		13	22	288 KB	2.6 MB	24 MB	24 MB	125 W	159 W	October 24, 2025	$294
Core Ultra 5	245	6	8	14	3.5	3.0	5.1	4.5	4 (64:4)	1.9	13	29	288 KB	2.6 MB	24 MB	24 MB	65 W	121 W	January 6, 2025	$270
Core Ultra 5	245T	6	8	14	2.2	1.7	5.1	4.5	4 (64:4)	1.9	13	29	288 KB	2.6 MB	24 MB	24 MB	35 W	114 W	January 6, 2025	$270
Core Ultra 5	235	6	8	14	3.4	2.9	5.0	4.4	3 (48:3)	2.0	13	27	288 KB	2.6 MB	24 MB	24 MB	65 W	121 W	January 6, 2025	$247
Core Ultra 5	235T	6	8	14	2.2	1.6	5.0	4.4	3 (48:3)	2.0	13	27	288 KB	2.6 MB	24 MB	24 MB	35 W	114 W	January 6, 2025	$247
Core Ultra 5	225	6	4	10	3.3	2.7	4.9	4.4	2 (32:2)	1.8	13	23	1.1 MB	1.5 MB	22 MB	20 MB	65 W	121 W	January 6, 2025	$236
Core Ultra 5	225F	6	4	10	3.3	2.7	4.9	4.4	—N/a		13	19	1.1 MB	1.5 MB	22 MB	20 MB	65 W	121 W	January 6, 2025	$221
Core Ultra 3	205	4	4	8	3.8	3.2	4.9	4.4	2 (32:2)	1.8	13	13	896 KB	1.5 MB	16 MB	15 MB	57 W	76 W	August, 2025	$130-$150 (Europe Only)

==== Mobile ====
===== Premium =====
Underlined models support Intel vPRO.

====== Repurposed Desktop ======
Core Ultra 200HX (Codenamed "Arrow Lake-HX")
Processor Family	Model	Cores			Clock rate (GHz)				Arc Graphics		TOPS (Int8)		Cache		TDP		Released	Price (USD)
Processor Family	Model	Cores			Base		Turbo		Arc Graphics		TOPS (Int8)		Cache		TDP		Released	Price (USD)
Processor Family	Model	P	E	Total	P	E	P	E	X^{e} Cores (VE:RT)	Clock (GHz)	NPU	Total	L2	L3	Base	Turbo	Released	Price (USD)
Core Ultra 9	285HX	8	16	24	2.8	2.1	5.5	4.6	4 (64:4)	2.0	13	36	40 MB	36 MB	55 W	160 W	January 6, 2025	$612
Core Ultra 9	275HX	8	16	24	2.7	2.1	5.4	4.6	4 (64:4)	1.9	13	36	40 MB	36 MB	55 W	160 W	January 6, 2025	$680
Core Ultra 7	265HX	8	12	20	2.6	2.3	5.3	4.6	4 (64:4)	1.9	13	33	36 MB	30 MB	55 W	160 W	January 6, 2025	$450
Core Ultra 7	255HX	8	12	20	2.4	1.8	5.2	4.5	4 (64:4)	1.85	13	33	36 MB	30 MB	55 W	160 W	January 6, 2025	$507
Core Ultra 7	251HX	6	12	16	2.9	2.5	5.1	4.5	3 (48:3)	1.8	13	30	30 MB	30 MB	55 W	160 W	January 6, 2025	
Core 7	245HX	6	8	14	2.9	2.6	5.1	4.5	3 (48:3)	1.8	13	27	26 MB	24 MB	55 W	160 W	January 6, 2025	
Core Ultra 5	245HX	6	8	14	3.1	2.6	5.1	4.5	3 (48:3)	1.9	13	27	26 MB	24 MB	55 W	160 W	January 6, 2025	$306
Core Ultra 5	235HX	6	8	14	2.9	2.6	5.1	4.5	3 (48:3)	1.8	13	27	26 MB	24 MB	55 W	160 W	January 6, 2025	$349

====== High Power ======
Core Ultra 200H Series (Conedamed "Arrow Lake-H")
Processor Family	Model	Cores				Clock rate (GHz)						Arc Graphics		TOPS (Int8)		Cache		TDP		Released	Price (USD)
Processor Family	Model	Cores				Base			Turbo			Arc Graphics		TOPS (Int8)		Cache		TDP		Released	Price (USD)
Processor Family	Model	P	E	LP-E	Total	P	E	LP-E	P	E	LP-E	X^{e} Cores (VE:RT)	Clock (GHz)	NPU	Total	L2	L3	Base	Turbo	Released	Price (USD)
Core Ultra 9	285H	6	8	2	16	2.9	2.7	1.0	5.4	4.5	2.5	8 (128:8)	2.35	13	99	26 MB	24 MB	45 W	115 W	January 6th, 2025	$651
Core Ultra 7	265H	6	8	2	16	2.2	1.7	0.7	5.3	4.5	2.5	8 (128:8)	2.3	13	97	26 MB	24 MB	28 W	115 W	January 6th, 2025	$471
Core Ultra 7	255H	6	8	2	16	2.0	1.5	0.7	5.1	4.4	2.5	8 (128:8)	2.25	13	96	26 MB	24 MB	28 W	115 W	January 6th, 2025	$514
Core Ultra 5	235H	4	8	2	14	2.4	1.8	0.7	5	4.4	2.5	8 (128:8)	2.25	13	94	20 MB	18 MB	28 W	115 W	January 6th, 2025	$354
Core Ultra 5	225H	4	8	2	14	1.7	1.3	0.7	4.9	4.3	2.5	7 (112:7)	2.2	13	83	20 MB	18 MB	28 W	115 W	January 6th, 2025	$385

====== Low Power ======
Arrow Lake-U uses refreshed Meteor Lake silicon fabricated on the Intel 3 node.

Core Ultra 200U Series (Codenamed "Arrow Lake-U")
Processor Family	Model	Cores (threads)				Clock rate (GHz)						Arc Graphics		TOPS (Int8)		Cache				TDP		Released	Price (USD)
Processor Family	Model	Cores (threads)				Base			Turbo			Arc Graphics		TOPS (Int8)		Cache				TDP		Released	Price (USD)
Processor Family	Model	P	E	LP-E	Total	P	E	LP-E	P	E	LP-E	X^{e} Cores (VE:RT)	Clock (GHz)	NPU	Total	L0	L1	L2	L3	Base	Turbo	Released	Price (USD)
Core Ultra 7	265U	2 (4)	8 (8)	2 (2)	12 (14)	2.1	1.7	0.7	5.3	4.2	2.4	4 (64:4)	2.1	12	24	96 KB	1.3 MB	14 MB	12 MB	15 W	57 W	Jan 6, 2025	$448
Core Ultra 7	255U	2 (4)	8 (8)	2 (2)	12 (14)	2.0	1.7	0.7	5.2	4.2	2.4	4 (64:4)	2.1	12	24	96 KB	1.3 MB	14 MB	12 MB	15 W	57 W	Jan 6, 2025	$490
Core Ultra 5	235U	2 (4)	8 (8)	2 (2)	12 (14)	2.0	1.5	0.7	4.9	4.1	2.4	4 (64:4)	2.05	12	24	96 KB	1.3 MB	14 MB	12 MB	15 W	57 W	Jan 6, 2025	$332
Core Ultra 5	225U	2 (4)	8 (8)	2 (2)	12 (14)	1.5	1.8	0.7	4.8	3.8	2.4	4 (64:4)	2.0	12	24	96 KB	1.3 MB	14 MB	12 MB	15 W	57 W	Jan 6, 2025	$363

====== Ultra Low Power ======
These parts are based on the Lunar Lake architecture and have on-package LPDDR5X-8533 RAM. Underlined models support vPro Enterprise.

Lunar lake does not support Hyper-Threading.

Core Ultra 200V Series (Codenamed "Lunar Lake")
Processor Family	Model	Cores			Clock rate (GHz)				Arc Graphics		TOPS (int8)		Smart Cache	Memory capacity	TDP		Released
Processor Family	Model	Cores			Base Clock (GHz)		Turbo Clock (GHz)		Arc Graphics		TOPS (int8)		Smart Cache	Memory capacity	TDP		Released
Processor Family	Model	P	LP-E	Total	P	LP-E	P	LP-E	X^{e} Cores (VE:RT)	Max. freq. (GHz)	NPU	Total	Smart Cache	Memory capacity	Base	Turbo	Released
Core Ultra 9	288V	4	4	8	3.3		5.1	3.7	8 (64:8)	2.05	48	120	12 MB	32 GB	30 W	37 W	September 3, 2024
Core Ultra 7	268V	4	4	8	2.2		5.0	3.7	8 (64:8)	2.0	48	118	12 MB	32 GB	30 W	37 W	September 3, 2024
Core Ultra 7	266V	4	4	8	2.2		5.0	3.7	8 (64:8)	2.0	48	118	12 MB	16 GB	30 W	37 W	September 3, 2024
Core Ultra 7	258V	4	4	8	2.2		4.8	3.7	8 (64:8)	1.95	47	115	12 MB	32 GB	30 W	37 W	September 3, 2024
Core Ultra 7	256V	4	4	8	2.2		4.8	3.7	8 (64:8)	1.95	47	115	12 MB	16 GB	30 W	37 W	September 3, 2024
Core Ultra 5	238V	4	4	8	2.1		4.7	3.5	7 (56:7)	1.85	40	97	8 MB	32 GB	30 W	37 W	September 3, 2024
Core Ultra 5	236V	4	4	8	2.1		4.7	3.5	7 (56:7)	1.85	40	97	8 MB	16 GB	30 W	37 W	September 3, 2024
Core Ultra 5	228V	4	4	8	2.1		4.5	3.5	7 (56:7)	1.85	40	97	8 MB	32 GB	30 W	37 W	September 3, 2024
Core Ultra 5	226V	4	4	8	2.1		4.5	3.5	7 (56:7)	1.85	40	97	8 MB	16 GB	30 W	37 W	September 3, 2024

===== Value =====
====== High Power ======
These processors are Re-Refreshes of Raptor Lake-H and not an Arrow Lake variant.

Core 200H Series (Codenamed "Raptor Lake-H Re-Refresh")
Processor Family	Model	Cores (threads)			Clock rate (GHz)				Graphics		Smart Cache	TDP		Released	Price (USD)
Processor Family	Model	Cores (threads)			Base		Turbo		Graphics		Smart Cache	TDP		Released	Price (USD)
Processor Family	Model	P	E	Total	P	E	P	E	EUs	Clock (GHz)	Smart Cache	Base	Turbo	Released	Price (USD)
Core 9	270H	6 (12)	8 (8)	14 (20)	2.7	2.0	5.8	4.1	96	1.55	24 MB	45 W	115 W	Q1 2025	$697
Core 7	250H	6 (12)	8 (8)	14 (20)	2.5	1.8	5.4	4.0	96	1.55	24 MB	45 W	115 W	Q1 2025	$502
Core 7	240H	6 (12)	4 (4)	10 (16)	2.5	1.8	5.2	4.0	64	1.55	24 MB	45 W	115 W	Q1 2025	$502
Core 5	220H	4 (8)	8 (8)	12 (16)	2.7	2.0	4.9	3.7	80	1.5	18 MB	45 W	95 W	Q1 2025	$342
Core 5	210H	4 (8)	4 (4)	8 (12)	2.2	1.6	4.8	3.6	48	1.4	12 MB	45 W	95 W	Q1 2025	$342

====== Low Power ======
These processors are Re-Refreshes of Raptor Lake-U with Hyper-Threading disabled.

Core 200U Series (Codenamed "Raptor Lake-U Re-Refresh")
Processor Family	Model	Cores (threads)			Clock rate (GHz)				Graphics		Smart Cache	TDP		Released	Price (USD)
Processor Family	Model	Cores (threads)			Base		Turbo		Graphics		Smart Cache	TDP		Released	Price (USD)
Processor Family	Model	P	E	Total	P	E	P	E	EUs	Clock (GHz)	Smart Cache	Base	Turbo	Released	Price (USD)
Core 7	250U	2 (2)	4 (4)	6 (6)	1.8	1.2	5.4	4.0	96	1.3	12 MB	15 W	55 W	Q1 2025	$426
Core 5	220U	2 (2)	4 (4)	6 (6)	1.4	0.9	5.0	3.8	80	1.3	12 MB	15 W	55 W	Q1 2025	$309

==== Embedded ====
These are Raptor Lake models released for socket LGA 1700.

===== Hybrid =====
Models in the table below feature a Hybrid design

Core 201E Series (Codenamed "Bartlett Lake")
Processor Family	Model	Cores			Clock rate (GHz)					Graphics		Smart Cache	TDP	Released	Price (USD)
Processor Family	Model	Cores			Base		Turbo		Max.	Graphics		Smart Cache	TDP	Released	Price (USD)
Processor Family	Model	P	E	Total	P	E	P	E	Max.	EUs	Clock (GHz)	Smart Cache	Base	Released	Price (USD)
Core 5	211E	6 (12)	4 (4)	10 (16)	2.7	2.0	4.9	3.7	4.9	24	1.55	20 MB	65 W	Q1 2025	$221
Core 5	211TE	6 (12)	4 (4)	10 (16)	1.7	1.3	4.8	3.4	4.8	24	1.55	20 MB	45 W	Q1 2025	$221
Core 5	221E	6 (12)	8 (8)	14 (20)	2.7	2.1	3.9	5.2	5.2	32	1.55	24 MB	65 W	Q1 2025	$223
Core 5	221TE	6 (12)	8 (8)	14 (20)	1.8	1.3	5.0	3.6	5.0	32	1.55	24 MB	45 W	Q1 2025	$223
Core 7	251E	8 (16)	16 (16)	24 (32)	2.1	1.6	5.6	4.4	5.6	32	1.66	36 MB	65 W	Q1 2025	$384
Core 7	251TE	8 (16)	16 (16)	24 (32)	1.4	1.0	5.4	3.9	5.4	32	1.6	36 MB	45 W	Q1 2025	$384

===== P-Core only =====
Models in the table below only contain P-Cores.

Core 203E Series (Codenamed "Bartlett Lake")
Processor Family	Model	Cores (threads)	Clock rate (GHz)			Graphics		Smart Cache	TDP	Released	Price (USD)
Processor Family	Model	Cores (threads)	Base	Turbo	Max.	EUs	Clock (GHz)	Smart Cache	Base	Released	Price (USD)
Core 3	201E	4 (8)	3.6	4.8	4.8	24	1.55	12 MB	60 W	Q1 2025	$134
Core 3	201TE	4 (8)	2.9	4.6	4.6	24	1.55	12 MB	45 W	Q1 2025	$134
Core 5	213PE	8 (16)	2.7	5.2	5.2	24	1.65	24 MB	65 W	Q1 2026	$221
Core 5	213PTE	8 (16)	2.1	5.2	5.2	24	1.65	24 MB	45 W	Q1 2026	$221
Core 5	223PE	8 (16)	2.9	5.4	5.4	32	1.65	24 MB	65 W	Q1 2026	$232
Core 5	223PTE	8 (16)	2.3	5.4	5.4	32	1.65	24 MB	45 W	Q1 2026	$232
Core 5	223PQE	8 (16)	4.0	5.5	5.5	32	1.65	24 MB	125 W	Q1 2026	$313
Core 7	253PE	10 (20)	2.5	5.3	5.5	32	1.65	33 MB	65 W	Q1 2026	$384
Core 7	253PTE	10 (20)	1.8	5.3	5.4	32	1.65	33 MB	45 W	Q1 2026	$384
Core 7	253PQE	10 (20)	3.5	5.5	5.7	32	1.65	33 MB	125 W	Q1 2026	$409
Core 9	273PE	12 (24)	2.3	5.4	5.7	32	1.65	36 MB	65 W	Q1 2026	$549
Core 9	273PTE	12 (24)	1.4	5.4	5.5	32	1.65	36 MB	45 W	Q1 2026	$549
Core 9	273PQE	12 (24)	3.4	5.5	5.9	32	1.65	36 MB	125 W	Q1 2026	$589

=== Core Series 1 ===
Core Ultra Series 1 was launched on December 14, 2023 under the codename Meteor Lake with mobile Raptor Lake-U Refresh parts launching as Core Series 1.

==== Mobile ====
Meteor Lake is the first Intel mobile generation to use a chiplet architecture, which means that the processor is a multi-chip module.

===== Premium =====
In June 2023, Intel unveiled new branding for the Meteor Lake processors, changing from the "Core i3/i5/i7/i9" branding to a new system of two brands: Core and Core Ultra, where Core is for everyday and value-oriented processors while Core Ultra is reserved for premium processors. These are also separated into Core 3/5/7/9 and Core Ultra 3/5/7/9.

====== High Power ======
Underlined models support Intel vPRO Enterprise.

Core Ultra 100H Series (Codenamed "Meteor Lake-H")
Processor Family	Model	Cores (threads)				Clock rate (GHz)						Arc Graphics		TOPS (Int8)		Smart Cache	Power		Released	Price (USD)
Processor Family	Model	Cores (threads)				Base			Turbo			Arc Graphics		TOPS (Int8)		Smart Cache	Power		Released	Price (USD)
Processor Family	Model	P	E	LP-E	Total	P	E	LP-E	P	E	LP-E	X^{e} Cores (VE:RT)	Clock (GHz)	NPU	Total	Smart Cache	Base	Turbo	Released	Price (USD)
Core Ultra 9	185H	6 (12)	8 (8)	2 (2)	16 (24)	2.3	1.8	1.0	5.1	3.8	2.5	8 (128)	2.35	11	35	24 MB	45 W	115 W	December 14, 2023	$640
Core Ultra 7	165H	6 (12)	8 (8)	2 (2)	16 (24)	1.4	0.9	0.7	5.0	3.8	2.5	8 (128)	2.3	11	34	24 MB	28 W	115 W	December 14, 2023	$460
Core Ultra 7	155H	6 (12)	8 (8)	2 (2)	16 (24)	1.4	0.9	0.7	4.8	3.8	2.5	8 (128)	2.25	11	33	24 MB	28 W	115 W	December 14, 2023	$503
Core Ultra 5	135H	4 (8)	8 (8)	2 (2)	14 (18)	1.7	1.2	0.7	4.6	3.6	2.5	8 (128)	2.2	11	33	18 MB	28 W	115 W	December 14, 2023	$342
Core Ultra 5	125H	4 (8)	8 (8)	2 (2)	14 (18)	1.2	0.7	0.7	4.5	3.6	2.5	7 (112)	2.2	11	33	18 MB	28 W	115 W	December 14, 2023	$375

====== Low Power ======
Underlined models support Intel vPRO Enterprise.

Core Ultra 105U Series (Codenamed "Meteor Lake-U15")
Processor Family	Model	Cores (threads)				Clock rate (GHz)						Arc Graphics		TOPS (Int8)		Smart Cache	Power		Released	Price (USD)
Processor Family	Model	Cores (threads)				Base			Turbo			Arc Graphics		TOPS (Int8)		Smart Cache	Power		Released	Price (USD)
Processor Family	Model	P	E	LP-E	Total	P	E	LP-E	P	E	LP-E	X^{e} Cores (VE:RT)	Clock (GHz)	NPU	Total	Smart Cache	Base	Turbo	Released	Price (USD)
Core Ultra 7	165U	2 (4)	8 (8)	2 (2)	12 (14)	1.7	1.2	0.7	4.9	3.8	2.1	4 (64)	2.0	11	22	12 MB	15 W	57 W	December 14, 2023	$448
Core Ultra 7	155U	2 (4)	8 (8)	2 (2)	12 (14)	1.7	1.2	0.7	4.8	3.8	2.1	4 (64)	1.95	11	22	12 MB	15 W	57 W	December 14, 2023	$460
Core Ultra 5	135U	2 (4)	8 (8)	2 (2)	12 (14)	1.7	1.1	0.7	4.4	3.6	2.1	4 (64)	1.9	11	22	12 MB	15 W	57 W	December 14, 2023	$322
Core Ultra 5	125U	2 (4)	8 (8)	2 (2)	12 (14)	1.3	0.8	0.7	4.3	3.6	2.1	4 (64)	1.85	11	21	12 MB	15 W	57 W	December 14, 2023	$363
Core Ultra 5	115U	2 (4)	4 (4)	2 (2)	8 (10)	1.5	1.0	0.7	4.2	3.5	2.1	3 (48)	1.8	11	21	10 MB	15 W	57 W	December 14, 2023	unspecified

====== Ultra Low Power ======
All models support Intel vPRO Enterprise.

Core Ultra 104U Series (Codenamed "Meteor Lake-U9")
Processor Family	Model	Cores (threads)				Clock rate (GHz)						Arc Graphics		TOPS (Int8)		Smart Cache	Power		Released	Price (USD)
Processor Family	Model	Cores (threads)				Base			Turbo			Arc Graphics		TOPS (Int8)		Smart Cache	Power		Released	Price (USD)
Processor Family	Model	P	E	LP-E	Total	P	E	LP-E	P	E	LP-E	X^{e} Cores (VE:RT)	Clock (GHz)	NPU	Total	Smart Cache	Base	Turbo	Released	Price (USD)
Core Ultra 7	164U	2 (4)	8 (8)	2 (2)	12 (14)	1.1	0.7	0.4	4.8	3.8	2.1	4 (64)	1.8	11	21	12 MB	9 W	30 W	December 14, 2023	$448
Core Ultra 5	134U	2 (4)	8 (8)	2 (2)	12 (14)	0.7	0.5	0.4	4.4	3.6	2.1	4 (64)	1.75	11	21	12 MB	9 W	30 W	December 14, 2023	$332

===== Value =====
To fill out the value segment, Intel had refreshed their Raptor Lake products and branded them as Core Series 1

====== Low Power ======
These processors are Re-Refreshes of Raptor Lake-U.

Core 100U Series (Codenamed "Raptor Lake-U Refresh")
Processor Family	Model	Cores (threads)			Clock rate (GHz)				Graphics		Smart Cache	Power		Released	Price (USD)
Processor Family	Model	Cores (threads)			Base		Turbo		Graphics		Smart Cache	Power		Released	Price (USD)
Processor Family	Model	P	E	Total	P	E	P	E	EUs	Clock (GHz)	Smart Cache	Base	Turbo	Released	Price (USD)
Core 7	150U	2 (4)	8 (8)	10 (12)	1.8	1.2	5.3	4.0	96	1.3	12 MB	15 W	55 W	Q1 2024	
Core 5	120U	2 (4)	8 (8)	10 (12)	1.4	0.9	5.0	3.8	80	1.25	12 MB	15 W	55 W	Q1 2024	$340
Core 3	100U	2 (4)	4 (4)	6 (8)	1.2	0.9	4.7	3.3	64	1.25	10 MB	15 W	55 W	Q1 2024	

====== E-Core only ======
These processors are Alder Lake.

Nx5x Series (Codenamed "Twin Lake-N")
Processor Family	Model	Cores (threads)	Clock rate (GHz)		Graphics		Smart Cache	Power		Released
Processor Family	Model	Cores (threads)	Base	Turbo	EUs	Clock (GHz)	Smart Cache	Down	Base	Released
Core 3	N355	8 (8)	1.8	3.9	32	1.35	6 MB	9 W	15 W	January 6, 2025
Core 3	N350	8 (8)	0.8	3.9	32	1.35	6 MB	Unknown	7 W	January 6, 2025
Intel Processor	N250	4 (4)	1.2	3.8	32	1.25	6 MB	Unknown	6 W	January 6, 2025
Intel Processor	N150	4 (4)	0.8	3.6	24	1.0	6 MB	Unknown	6 W	January 6, 2025

==== IoT/Embedded ====
These are processors based on Meteor Lake-PS die and are designed for use in Internet of Things devices and embedded systems.

===== Premium =====
====== High Power ======
Core Ultra 100HL Series (Codenamed "Meteor Lake-PS")
Processor Family	Model	Cores (Threads)				Clock rate (GHz)						Arc Graphics		Smart Cache	Power		Released	Price (USD)
Processor Family	Model	Cores (Threads)				Base			Turbo			Arc Graphics		Smart Cache	Power		Released	Price (USD)
Processor Family	Model	P	E	LP-E	Total	P	E	LP-E	P	E	LP-E	X^{e} Cores (VE:RT)	Clock (GHz)	Smart Cache	Base	Turbo	Released	Price (USD)
Core Ultra 7	165HL	6 (12)	8 (8)	2 (2)	16 (24)	1.4	0.9	0.7	5.0	3.8	2.5	8 (128:8)	2.3	24 MB	45 W	115 W	Q2 2024	$459
Core Ultra 7	155HL	6 (12)	8 (8)	2 (2)	16 (24)	1.4	0.9	0.7	4.8	3.8	2.5	8 (128:8)	2.25	24 MB	45 W	115 W	Q2 2024	$438
Core Ultra 5	135HL	4 (8)	8 (8)	2 (2)	14 (20)	1.7	1.2	0.7	4.6	3.6	2.5	8 (128:8)	2.2	18 MB	45 W	115 W	Q2 2024	$341
Core Ultra 5	125HL	4 (8)	8 (8)	2 (2)	14 (20)	1.2	0.7	0.7	4.5	3.6	2.5	7 (112:7)	2.2	18 MB	45 W	115 W	Q2 2024	$325

====== Low Power ======
Core Ultra 100UL Series (Codenamed "Meteor Lake-PS")
Processor Family	Model	Cores (Threads)				Clock rate (GHz)						Arc Graphics		Smart Cache	Power		Released	Price (USD)
Processor Family	Model	Cores (Threads)				Base			Turbo			Arc Graphics		Smart Cache	Power		Released	Price (USD)
Processor Family	Model	P	E	LP-E	Total	P	E	LP-E	P	E	LP-E	X^{e} Cores (VE:RT)	Clock (GHz)	Smart Cache	Base	Turbo	Released	Price (USD)
Core Ultra 7	165UL	2 (4)	8 (8)	2 (2)	16 (24)	1.7	1.2	0.7	4.9	3.8	2.1	4 (64:4)	2.0	12 MB	15 W	57 W	Q2 2024	$447
Core Ultra 7	155UL	2 (4)	8 (8)	2 (2)	16 (24)	1.7	1.2	0.7	4.8	3.8	2.1	4 (64:4)	1.95	12 MB	15 W	57 W	Q2 2024	$426
Core Ultra 5	135UL	2 (4)	8 (8)	2 (2)	16 (24)	1.6	1.1	0.7	4.4	3.6	2.1	4 (64:4)	1.9	12 MB	15 W	57 W	Q2 2024	$331
Core Ultra 5	125UL	2 (4)	8 (8)	2 (2)	16 (24)	1.3	0.8	0.7	4.3	3.6	2.1	4 (64:4)	1.85	12 MB	15 W	57 W	Q2 2024	$309
Core Ultra 3	105UL	2 (4)	4 (4)	2 (2)	8 (10)	1.5	1.0	0.7	4.2	3.5	2.1	3 (48:3)	1.8	10 MB	15 W	57 W	Q2 2024	$295

=== 14th generation Core i ===
==== Desktop ====
An iterative refresh of Raptor Lake-S desktop processors, called the 14th generation of Intel Core, was launched on October 17, 2023.

Socket LGA 1700

Underlined models feature UDIMM ECC memory support when paired with a motherboard based on the W680 chipset according to each respective Intel Ark product page.

Core i5/i7/i9 14000 Series (Codenamed "Raptor Lake-S Refresh")
Processor branding	Model	Cores (threads)			Clock rate (GHz)						GPU		Smart cache	TDP		Price (USD) (Note: Price is Recommended Customer Price (RCP) at launch. RCP is the trade price that processors are sold by Intel to retailers and OEMs. Actual MSRP for consumers is higher)
Processor branding	Model	Cores (threads)			Base		Turbo Boost				Model	Max. freq. (GHz)	Smart cache	TDP		Price (USD)
Processor branding	Model	Cores (threads)			Base		2.0		3.0	TVB	Model	Max. freq. (GHz)	Smart cache	TDP		Price (USD)
Processor branding	Model	P	E	Total	P	E	P	E	P	P	Model	Max. freq. (GHz)	Smart cache	Base	Turbo	Price (USD)
Core i9	14900KS	8 (16)	16 (16)	24 (32)	3.2	2.4	5.9	4.5	6.2	6.2	UHD 770	1.65	36 MB	150 W	253 W	$689
Core i9	14900K	8 (16)	16 (16)	24 (32)	3.2	2.4	5.6	4.4	5.8	6	UHD 770	1.65	36 MB	125 W	253 W	$589
Core i9	14900KF	8 (16)	16 (16)	24 (32)	3.2	2.4	5.6	4.4	5.8	—N/a		-	36 MB	125 W	253 W	$564
Core i9	14900	8 (16)	16 (16)	24 (32)	2.0	1.5	5.4	4.3	5.6	5.8	UHD 770	1.65	36 MB	65 W	219 W	$549
Core i9	14900F	8 (16)	16 (16)	24 (32)	2.0	1.5	5.4	4.3	5.6	5.8	—N/a	-	36 MB	65 W	219 W	$524
Core i9	14900T	8 (16)	16 (16)	24 (32)	1.1	0.8	5.1	4.0	5.5	—N/a	UHD 770	1.65	36 MB	35 W	106 W	$549
Core i7	14790F	8 (16)	8 (8)	16 (24)	2.1	1.5	5.3	4.2	5.4	—N/a	—N/a	—N/a		65 W	219 W	China only
Core i7	14700K	8 (16)	12 (12)	20 (28)	3.4	2.5	5.5	4.3	5.6	—N/a	UHD 770	1.6	33 MB	125 W	253 W	$409
Core i7	14700KF	8 (16)	12 (12)	20 (28)	3.4	2.5	5.5	4.3	5.6	—N/a	—N/a		33 MB	125 W	253 W	$384
Core i7	14700	8 (16)	12 (12)	20 (28)	2.1	1.5	5.3	4.2	5.4	—N/a	UHD 770	1.6	33 MB	65 W	219 W	$384
Core i7	14700F	8 (16)	12 (12)	20 (28)	2.1	1.5	5.3	4.2	5.4	—N/a	—N/a		33 MB	65 W	219 W	$359
Core i7	14700T	8 (16)	12 (12)	20 (28)	1.3	0.9	5.0	3.7	5.2	—N/a	UHD 770	1.6	33 MB	35 W	106 W	$384
Core i5	14600K	6 (12)	8 (8)	14 (20)	3.5	2.6	5.3	4.0	—N/a	—N/a	UHD 770	1.55	24 MB	125 W	181 W	$319
Core i5	14600KF	6 (12)	8 (8)	14 (20)	3.5	2.6	5.3	4.0	—N/a	—N/a	—N/a		24 MB	125 W	181 W	$294
Core i5	14600	6 (12)	8 (8)	14 (20)	2.7	2.0	5.2	3.9	—N/a	—N/a	UHD 770	1.55	24 MB	65 W	154 W	$255
Core i5	14600T	6 (12)	8 (8)	14 (20)	1.8	1.3	5.1	3.6	—N/a	—N/a	UHD 770	1.55	24 MB	35 W	92 W	$255

These models are actually Alder Lake.

Intel Processor 300/Core i3/5 14000 Series (Codenamed "Raptor Lake-S Refresh")
Processor branding	Model	Cores (threads)			Clock rate (GHz)				GPU		Smart cache	TDP		Price (USD)
Processor branding	Model	Cores (threads)			Base		Turbo Boost		Model	Max. freq. (GHz)	Smart cache	TDP		Price (USD)
Processor branding	Model	Cores (threads)			Base		2.0		Model	Max. freq. (GHz)	Smart cache	TDP		Price (USD)
Processor branding	Model	P	E	Total	P	E	P	E	Model	Max. freq. (GHz)	Smart cache	Base	Turbo	Price (USD)
Core i5	14500	6 (12)	8 (8)	14 (20)	2.6	1.9	5.0	3.7	UHD 770	1.55	24 MB	65 W	154 W	$232
Core i5	14500T	6 (12)	8 (8)	14 (20)	1.7	1.2	4.8	3.4	UHD 770	1.55	24 MB	35 W	92 W	$232
Core i5	14490F	6 (12)	4 (4)	10 (16)	2.8	2.1	4.9	3.7	—N/a		24 MB	65 W	148 W	China only
Core i5	14400	6 (12)	4 (4)	10 (16)	2.5	1.8	4.7	3.5	UHD 730	1.55	20 MB	65 W	148 W	$221
Core i5	14400F	6 (12)	4 (4)	10 (16)	2.5	1.8	4.7	3.5	—N/a		20 MB	65 W	148 W	$196
Core i5	14400T	6 (12)	4 (4)	10 (16)	1.5	1.1	4.5	3.2	UHD 730	1.55	20 MB	35 W	82 W	$221
Core i3	14100	4 (8)	—N/a	4 (8)	3.5	—N/a	4.7	—N/a	UHD 730	1.5	12 MB	60 W	110 W	$134
Core i3	14100F	4 (8)	—N/a	4 (8)	3.5	—N/a	4.7	—N/a	—N/a		12 MB	58 W	110 W	$109
Core i3	14100T	4 (8)	—N/a	4 (8)	2.7	—N/a	4.4	—N/a	UHD 730	1.5	12 MB	35 W	69 W	$134
Intel Processor	300	2 (4)	—N/a	2 (4)	3.9	—N/a	—N/a	—N/a	UHD 710	1.45	6 MB	46 W	—N/a	$82
Intel Processor	300T	2 (4)	—N/a	2 (4)	3.4	—N/a	—N/a	—N/a	UHD 710	1.45	6 MB	35 W	—N/a	$82

==== Mobile ====
An iterative refresh of Raptor Lake-HX mobile processors, called the 14th generation of Intel Core, was launched on Jan 9, 2024

Core i5/i7/i9 14000HX (Codenamed "Raptor Lake-HX Refresh")
Processor branding	Model	Cores (threads)			Clock rate (GHz)				UHD Graphics		Smart cache	TDP		Price (USD)
Processor branding	Model	Cores (threads)			Base clock (GHz)		Turbo Boost (GHz)		UHD Graphics		Smart cache	TDP		Price (USD)
Processor branding	Model	P	E	Total	P	E	P	E	EUs	Boost clock (GHz)	Smart cache	Base (cTDP)	Turbo	Price (USD)
Core i9	14900HX	8 (16)	16 (16)	24 (32)	2.2	1.6	5.8	4.1	32	1.65	36 MB	55 W (45 W)	157 W	$679
Core i7	14700HX	8 (16)	12 (12)	20 (28)	2.1	1.5	5.5	1.6	32	33 MB	$495	55 W (45 W)	157 W	
Core i7	14650HX	8 (16)	8 (8)	16 (24)	2.2	1.6	5.2	3.7	16	30 MB	$495	55 W (45 W)	157 W	
Core i5	14500HX	6 (12)	8 (8)	14 (20)	2.6	1.9	4.9	3.5	32	1.55	24 MB	55 W (45 W)	157 W	$337
Core i5	14450HX	6 (12)	4 (4)	10 (16)	2.4	1.8	4.8	3.5	16	1.5	20 MB	55 W (45 W)	157 W	$337

=== 13th generation Core i ===
==== Desktop ====
Underlined models feature vPro Enterprise and UDIMM ECC memory support when paired with a motherboard based on the W680 chipset.

Core i5/i7/i9-13000 Series (Codenamed "Raptor Lake-S")
Processor family	Model	Cores (threads)			Clock rate (GHz)						Integrated graphics			Cache		TDP (W)		Price (USD)	Socket	Launch
Processor family	Model	Cores (threads)			Base		Turbo 2.0		Max. Turbo	Turbo max. 3.0	GPU	Boost clock (GHz)	EUs	L2 cache	Smart cache	Base	Turbo	Price (USD)	Socket	Launch
Processor family	Model	P	E	Total	P	E	P	E	Max. Turbo	Turbo max. 3.0	GPU	Boost clock (GHz)	EUs	L2 cache	Smart cache	Base	Turbo	Price (USD)	Socket	Launch
Core i9	13900KS	8 (16)	16 (16)	24 (32)	3.2	2.4	5.4	4.3	6.0	5.8		1.65 GHz	32	32 MB	36 MB	150	253	$700	LGA 1700	January 12, 2023
Core i9	13900K	8 (16)	16 (16)	24 (32)	3.0	2.2	5.4	4.3	5.8	5.7		1.65 GHz	32	32 MB	36 MB	125	253	$589	LGA 1700	October 20, 2022
Core i9	13900KF	8 (16)	16 (16)	24 (32)	3.0	2.2	5.4	4.3	5.8	5.7	—N/a			32 MB	36 MB	125	253	$564	LGA 1700	October 20, 2022
Core i9	13900	8 (16)	16 (16)	24 (32)	2.0	1.5	5.2	4.2	5.6	5.5	UHD 770	1.65 GHz	32	32 MB	36 MB	65	219	$549	LGA 1700	January 3, 2023
Core i9	13900F	8 (16)	16 (16)	24 (32)	2.0	1.5	5.2	4.2	5.6	5.5	—N/a			32 MB	36 MB	65	219	$524	LGA 1700	January 3, 2023
Core i9	13900T	8 (16)	16 (16)	24 (32)	1.1	0.8	5.1	3.9	5.3		UHD 770	1.65 GHz	32	32 MB	36 MB	35	106	$549	LGA 1700	January 3, 2023
Core i7	13700K	8 (16)	8 (8)	16 (24)	3.4	2.5	5.3	4.2	5.4		UHD 770	1.6 GHz	32	24 MB	30 MB	125	253	$409	LGA 1700	October 20, 2022
Core i7	13700KF	8 (16)	8 (8)	16 (24)	3.4	2.5	5.3	4.2	5.4		—N/a			24 MB	30 MB	125	253	$384	LGA 1700	October 20, 2022
Core i7	13790F	8 (16)	8 (8)	16 (24)	2.1	1.5	5.1	4.1	5.2		—N/a			24 MB	33 MB	65	219	China only	LGA 1700	February 8, 2023
Core i7	13700	8 (16)	8 (8)	16 (24)	2.1	1.5	5.1	4.1	5.2		UHD 770	1.6 GHz	32	24 MB	30 MB	65	219	$384	LGA 1700	January 3, 2023
Core i7	13700F	8 (16)	8 (8)	16 (24)	2.1	1.5	5.1	4.1	5.2		—N/a			24 MB	30 MB	65	219	$359	LGA 1700	January 3, 2023
Core i7	13700T	8 (16)	8 (8)	16 (24)	1.4	1.0	4.8	3.6	4.9		UHD 770	1.6 GHz	32	24 MB	30 MB	35	106	$384	LGA 1700	January 3, 2023
Core i5	13600K	6 (12)	8 (8)	14 (20)	3.5	2.6	5.1	3.9	5.1	—N/a	UHD 770	1.5 GHz	32	20 MB	24 MB	125	181	$319	LGA 1700	October 20, 2022
Core i5	13600KF	6 (12)	8 (8)	14 (20)	3.5	2.6	5.1	3.9	5.1	—N/a	—N/a			20 MB	24 MB	125	181	$294	LGA 1700	October 20, 2022

Models in the table below are refreshed Alder Lake models.

Core i5/i3-13000 Series (Codenamed "Raptor Lake-S")
Processor family	Model	Cores (threads)			Clock rate (GHz)					Integrated graphics			Cache		TDP (W)		Price (USD)	Socket	Launch
Processor family	Model	Cores (threads)			Base		Turbo 2.0		Max. Turbo	GPU	Boost clock (GHz)	EUs	L2 cache	Smart cache	Base	Turbo	Price (USD)	Socket	Launch
Processor family	Model	P	E	Total	P	E	P	E	Max. Turbo	GPU	Boost clock (GHz)	EUs	L2 cache	Smart cache	Base	Turbo	Price (USD)	Socket	Launch
Core i5	13600	6 (12)	8 (8)	14 (20)	2.7	2.0	5.0	3.7	5.0	UHD 770	1.55 GHz	32	11.5 MB	24 MB	65	154	$255	LGA 1700	January 3, 2023
Core i5	13600T	6 (12)	8 (8)	14 (20)	1.8	1.3	4.8	3.4	4.8	UHD 770	1.55 GHz	32	11.5 MB	24 MB	35	92	$255	LGA 1700	January 3, 2023
Core i5	13500	6 (12)	8 (8)	14 (20)	2.5	1.8	4.8	3.5	4.8	UHD 770	1.55 GHz	32	11.5 MB	24 MB	65	154	$232	LGA 1700	January 3, 2023
Core i5	13500T	6 (12)	8 (8)	14 (20)	1.6	1.2	4.6	3.2	4.6	UHD 770	1.55 GHz	32	11.5 MB	24 MB	35	92	$232	LGA 1700	January 3, 2023
Core i5	13400	6 (12)	4 (4)	10 (16)	2.5	1.8	4.6	3.3	4.6	UHD 730	1.55 GHz	24	9.5 MB	20 MB	65	154	$221	LGA 1700	January 3, 2023
Core i5	13400F	6 (12)	4 (4)	10 (16)	2.5	1.8	4.6	3.3	4.6	—N/a			9.5 MB	20 MB	65	148	$196	LGA 1700	January 3, 2023
Core i5	13400T	6 (12)	4 (4)	10 (16)	1.3	1.0	4.4	3.0	4.4	UHD 730	1.55 GHz	24	9.5 MB	20 MB	35	82	$221	LGA 1700	January 3, 2023
Core i5	13490F	6 (12)	4 (4)	10 (16)	2.5	1.8	4.8	3.5	4.8	—N/a			9.5 MB	24 MB	65	148	China only	LGA 1700	February 8, 2023
Core i3	13100	4 (8)	—N/a	4 (8)	3.4	—N/a	4.5	—N/a	4.5	UHD 730	1.5 GHz	24	5 MB	12 MB	60	89	$134	LGA 1700	January 3, 2023
Core i3	13100F	4 (8)	—N/a	4 (8)	3.4	—N/a	4.5	—N/a	4.5	—N/a			5 MB	12 MB	58	89	$109	LGA 1700	January 3, 2023
Core i3	13100T	4 (8)	—N/a	4 (8)	2.5	—N/a	4.2	—N/a	4.2	UHD 730	1.5 GHz	24	5 MB	12 MB	35	69	$134	LGA 1700	January 3, 2023

==== Mobile ====
===== Repurposed Desktop =====
These parts are desktop processors repurposed for mobile use. All models are unlocked for overclocking. Underlined models feature vPro Enterprise and UDIMM ECC memory support when paired with a motherboard based on the mobile workstation WM790 chipset.

Core i7/i9-13000HX Series (Codenamed "Raptor Lake-HX")
Processor family	Model	Cores (Threads)			Clock (GHz)				UHD graphics		Smart Cache	TDP (W)		Price (USD)	Launch
Processor family	Model	Cores (Threads)			Base Clock		Turbo Clock		UHD graphics		Smart Cache	TDP (W)		Price (USD)	Launch
Processor family	Model	P	E	Total	P	E	P	E	EUs	Boost Clock (GHz)	Smart Cache	Base	Turbo	Price (USD)	Launch
Core i9	13980HX	8 (16)	16 (16)	24 (32)	2.2	1.6	5.6	4.0	32	1.65	36 MB	55 W	157 W	$668	January 4, 2023
Core i9	13950HX	8 (16)	16 (16)	24 (32)	2.2	1.6	5.5	4.0	32	1.65	36 MB	55 W	157 W	$590	January 4, 2023
Core i9	13900HX	8 (16)	16 (16)	24 (32)	2.2	1.6	5.4	3.9	32	1.65	36 MB	55 W	157 W	$668	January 4, 2023
Core i7	13850HX	8 (16)	12 (12)	20 (28)	2.1	1.5	5.3	3.8	32	1.6	30 MB	55 W	157 W	$428	January 4, 2023
Core i7	13700HX	8 (16)	8 (8)	16 (24)	2.1	1.5	5.0	3.7	32	1.55	30 MB	55 W	157 W	$485	January 4, 2023
Core i7	13650HX	6 (12)	8 (8)	18 (20)	2.6	1.9	4.9	3.6	16	1.55	24 MB	55 W	157 W	$485	January 4, 2023

The models in the table below are still desktop replacement parts, but they are based on the Alder Lake architecture and are refreshed for Raptor Lake.

Core i5-13000HX Series (Codenamed "Raptor Lake-HX")
Processor family	Model	Cores (Threads)			Clock (GHz)				UHD graphics		Smart Cache	TDP (W)		Price (USD)	Launch
Processor family	Model	Cores (Threads)			Base Clock		Turbo Clock		UHD graphics		Smart Cache	TDP (W)		Price (USD)	Launch
Processor family	Model	P	E	Threads	P	E	P	E	EUs	Boost Clock (GHz)	Smart Cache	Base	Turbo	Price (USD)	Launch
Core i5	13600HX	6 (12)	8 (8)	14 (20)	2.6	1.9	4.8	3.6	32	1.5	24 MB	55 W	157 W	$284	January 4, 2023
Core i5	13500HX	6 (12)	8 (8)	14 (20)	2.5	1.8	4.7	3.5	32	1.5	24 MB	55 W	157 W	$326	January 4, 2023
Core i5	13450HX	6 (12)	4 (4)	16	2.4	1.8	4.6	3.4	16	1.45	20 MB	55 W	157 W	$326	January 4, 2023

===== High Power =====
Underlined models feature vPro Enterprise.

Core i5/i7/i9-13000H Series (Codenamed "Raptor Lake-H")
Processor family	Model	Cores (Threads)			Clock (GHz)				Graphics			Smart Cache	TDP (W)		Price (USD)	Launch
Processor family	Model	Cores (Threads)			Base Clock		Turbo Clock		Graphics			Smart Cache	TDP (W)		Price (USD)	Launch
Processor family	Model	P	E	Threads	P	E	P	E	EUs	Boost Clock (GHz)	Branding	Smart Cache	Base	Turbo	Price (USD)	Launch
Core i9	13900HK	6 (12)	8 (8)	14 (20)	2.6	1.9	5.4	4.1	96	1.5	Intel Iris Xe Graphics	24 MB	45 W	115 W	$697	January 4, 2023
Core i9	13900H	6 (12)	8 (8)	14 (20)	2.6	1.9	5.4	4.1	96	1.5	Intel Iris Xe Graphics	24 MB	45 W	115 W	$617	January 4, 2023
Core i7	13800H	6 (12)	8 (8)	14 (20)	2.5	1.8	5.2	4.0	96	1.5	Intel Iris Xe Graphics	24 MB	45 W	115 W	$457	January 4, 2023
Core i7	13700H	6 (12)	8 (8)	14 (20)	2.4	1.8	5.0	3.7	96	1.5	Intel Iris Xe Graphics	24 MB	45 W	115 W	$502	January 4, 2023
Core i7	13620H	6 (12)	4 (4)	10 (16)	2.4	1.8	4.9	3.6	64	1.5	Intel UHD Graphics	24 MB	45 W	115 W	$502	January 4, 2023
Core i5	13600H	4 (8)	8 (8)	12 (16)	2.8	2.1	4.8	3.6	80	1.5	Intel Iris Xe Graphics	12 MB	45 W	95 W	$311	January 4, 2023
Core i5	13500H	4 (8)	8 (8)	12 (16)	2.6	1.9	4.7	3.5	80	1.45	Intel Iris Xe Graphics	12 MB	45 W	95 W	$342	January 4, 2023
Core i5	13420H	4 (8)	4 (4)	12	2.1	1.5	4.6	3.4	48	1.4	Intel UHD Graphics	12 MB	45 W	95 W	$342	January 4, 2023

===== High Power Thin and Light =====
These CPUs are on the BGA1792 socket and are soldered to the motherboard.

Core i5/i7/i9-13005H Series (Codenamed "Raptor Lake-PX")}
Processor family	Model	Cores (Threads)			Clock Rate (GHz)				Intel Iris Xe graphics		Smart Cache	TDP (W)		Price (USD)	Launch
Processor family	Model	Cores (Threads)			Base Clock		Turbo Clock		Intel Iris Xe graphics		Smart Cache	TDP (W)		Price (USD)	Launch
Processor family	Model	P	E	Total	P	E	P	E	EUs	Boost Clock (GHz)	Smart Cache	Base	Turbo	Price (USD)	Launch
Core i9	13905H	6 (12)	8 (8)	14 (20)	2.6	1.9	5.4	4.1	96	1.5	24 MB	45 W	115 W	$697	January 4, 2023
Core i7	13705H	6 (12)	8 (8)	14 (20)	2.4	1.8	5.0	3.7	96	1.5	24 MB	45 W	115 W	$502	January 4, 2023
Core i5	13505H	4 (8)	8 (8)	12 (16)	2.6	1.9	4.7	3.5	80	1.45	18 MB	45 W	115 W	$342	January 4, 2023

===== Low Power Thin and Light =====
Underlined models feature vPro Enterprise.

Core i5/i7-1300P Series (Codenamed "Raptor Lake-P")
Processor family	Model	Cores (Threads)			Clock Rate (GHz)				Intel Iris Xe graphics		Smart Cache	TDP (W)		Price (USD)	Launch
Processor family	Model	Cores (Threads)			Base Clock		Turbo Clock		Intel Iris Xe graphics		Smart Cache	TDP (W)		Price (USD)	Launch
Processor family	Model	P	E	Total	P	E	P	E	EUs	Turbo	Smart Cache	Base	Turbo	Price (USD)	Launch
Core i7	1370P	6 (12)	8 (8)	14 (20)	1.9	1.4	5.2	3.9	96	1.5	24 MB	28 W	64 W	$438	January 4, 2023
Core i7	1360P	4 (8)	8 (8)	12 (16)	2.2	1.6	5.0	3.7	96	1.5	18 MB	28 W	64 W	$480	January 4, 2023
Core i5	1350P	4 (8)	8 (8)	12 (16)	1.9	1.4	4.7	3.5	80	1.5	12 MB	28 W	64 W	$320	January 4, 2023
Core i5	1340P	4 (8)	8 (8)	12 (16)	1.9	1.4	4.6	3.4	80	1.45	12 MB	28 W	64 W	$353	January 4, 2023

===== Low Power =====
Underlined models feature vPro Enterprise.

U300 & Core i3/i5/i7-1300U Series (Codenamed "Raptor Lake-U")
Processor family	Model	Cores			Clock Rate (GHz)				Intel Graphics			Smart Cache	TDP (W)	Price (USD)	Launch
Processor family	Model	Cores			Base Clock		Turbo Clock		Intel Graphics			Smart Cache	TDP (W)	Price (USD)	Launch
Processor family	Model	P	E	Total	P	E	P	E	EUs	Boost Clock (GHz)	Branding	Smart Cache	Base	Price (USD)	Launch
Core i7	1365U	2 (4)	8 (8)	10 (12)	1.8	1.3	5.2	3.9	96	1.3	Intel Iris Xe Graphics	12 MB	15 W	$426	January 4, 2023
Core i7	1355U	2 (4)	8 (8)	10 (12)	1.7	1.2	5.0	3.7	96	1.3	Intel Iris Xe Graphics	12 MB	15 W	$469	January 4, 2023
Core i5	1345U	2 (4)	8 (8)	10 (12)	1.6	1.2	4.7	3.5	80	1.25	Intel Iris Xe Graphics	12 MB	15 W	$309	January 4, 2023
Core i5	1335U	2 (4)	8 (8)	10 (12)	1.3	0.9	4.6	3.4	80	1.25	Intel Iris Xe Graphics	12 MB	15 W	$340	January 4, 2023
Core i5	1334U	2 (4)	8 (8)	10 (12)	1.3	0.9	4.6	3.4	80	1.25	Intel Iris Xe Graphics	12 MB	15 W	$340	January 4, 2023
Core i3	1315U	2 (4)	4 (4)	6 (8)	1.2	0.9	4.5	3.3	64	1.25	Intel UHD Graphics	10 MB	15 W	$309	January 4, 2023
Core i3	1305U	1 (2)	4 (4)	5 (6)	1.6	1.2	4.5	3.3	64	1.25	Intel UHD Graphics	10 MB	15 W	$309	January 4, 2023
Intel Processor	U300	1 (2)	4 (4)	5 (6)	1.2	0.9	4.4	3.3	48	1.1	Intel UHD Graphics	8 MB	15 W	$193	January 4, 2023

=== 12th generation Core I ===
Underlined models support UDIMM ECC memory when paired with a W680 chipset.

==== Desktop ====
Core i3/i5/i7/i9-12000/Pentium G7000/Celeron G6000 Series (Codenamed "Alder Lake-S")
Processor family	Model	Cores (Threads)			Clock rate (GHz)						Integrated graphics			Cache		TDP (W)		Price (USD)	Socket	Launch
Processor family	Model	Cores (Threads)			Base		Turbo				GPU	Max Clock	EUs	L2 cache	Smart cache	Base	Turbo	Price (USD)	Socket	Launch
Processor family	Model	P	E	Total	P	E	P	E	3.0	TVB	GPU	Max Clock	EUs	L2 cache	Smart cache	Base	Turbo	Price (USD)	Socket	Launch
Core i9	12900KS	8 (16)	8 (8)	16 (24)	3.4	2.5	5.2	4.0	5.3	5.5	UHD 770	1.55 GHz	32	14 MB	30 MB	150	241	$ 739	LGA 1700	Q1 2022
Core i9	12900K	8 (16)	8 (8)	16 (24)	3.2	2.4	5.1	3.9	5.2	—N/a	UHD 770	1.55 GHz	32	14 MB	30 MB	125	241	$ 589	LGA 1700	Q4 2021
Core i9	12900KF	8 (16)	8 (8)	16 (24)	3.2	2.4	5.1	3.9	5.2	—N/a	—N/a			14 MB	30 MB	125	241	$ 569	LGA 1700	Q4 2021
Core i9	12900	8 (16)	8 (8)	16 (24)	2.4	1.8	5.0	3.8	5.1	—N/a	UHD 770	1.55 GHz	32	14 MB	30 MB	65	202	$ 489	LGA 1700	Q1 2022
Core i9	12900F	8 (16)	8 (8)	16 (24)	2.4	1.8	5.0	3.8	5.1	—N/a	—N/a			14 MB	30 MB	65	202	$ 464	LGA 1700	Q1 2022
Core i9	12900T	8 (16)	8 (8)	16 (24)	1.4	1.0	4.8	3.6	4.9	—N/a	UHD 770	1.55 GHz	32	14 MB	30 MB	35	106	$ 489	LGA 1700	Q1 2022
Core i7	12700K	8 (16)	4 (4)	12 (20)	3.6	2.7	4.9	3.8	5.0	—N/a	UHD 770	1.5 GHz	32	12 MB	25 MB	125	190	$ 409	LGA 1700	Q4 2021
Core i7	12700KF	8 (16)	4 (4)	12 (20)	3.6	2.7	4.9	3.8	5.0	—N/a	—N/a			12 MB	25 MB	125	190	$ 384	LGA 1700	Q4 2021
Core i7	12700	8 (16)	4 (4)	12 (20)	2.1	1.6	4.8	3.6	4.9	—N/a	UHD 770	1.5 GHz	32	12 MB	25 MB	65	180	$ 339	LGA 1700	Q1 2022
Core i7	12700F	8 (16)	4 (4)	12 (20)	2.1	1.6	4.8	3.6	4.9	—N/a	—N/a			12 MB	25 MB	65	180	$ 314	LGA 1700	Q1 2022
Core i7	12700T	8 (16)	4 (4)	12 (20)	1.4	1.0	4.6	3.4	4.7	—N/a	UHD 770	1.5 GHz	32	12 MB	25 MB	35	95	$ 339	LGA 1700	Q1 2022
Core i5	12600K	6 (12)	4 (4)	10 (16)	3.7	2.8	4.9	3.6	4.9	—N/a	UHD 770	1.45 GHz	32	9.5 MB	20 MB	125	150	$ 289	LGA 1700	Q4 2021
Core i5	12600KF	6 (12)	4 (4)	10 (16)	3.7	2.8	4.9	3.6	4.9	—N/a	—N/a			9.5 MB	20 MB	125	150	$ 264	LGA 1700	Q4 2021
Core i5	12600	6 (12)	—N/a	6 (12)	3.3	—N/a	4.8	—N/a	4.8	—N/a	UHD 770	1.45 GHz	32	7.5 MB	18 MB	65	117	$ 223	LGA 1700	Q1 2022
Core i5	12600T	6 (12)	—N/a	6 (12)	2.1	—N/a	4.6	—N/a	4.6	—N/a	UHD 770	1.45 GHz	32	7.5 MB	18 MB	35	74	$ 223	LGA 1700	Q1 2022
Core i5	12500	6 (12)	—N/a	6 (12)	3.0	—N/a	4.6	—N/a	4.6	—N/a	UHD 770	1.45 GHz	32	7.5 MB	18 MB	65	117	$ 202	LGA 1700	Q1 2022
Core i5	12500T	6 (12)	—N/a	6 (12)	2.0	—N/a	4.4	—N/a	4.4	—N/a	UHD 770	1.45 GHz	32	7.5 MB	18 MB	35	74	$ 202	LGA 1700	Q1 2022
Core i5	12400	6 (12)	—N/a	6 (12)	2.5	—N/a	4.4	—N/a	4.4	—N/a	UHD 730	1.45 GHz	24	7.5 MB	18 MB	65	117	$ 192	LGA 1700	Q1 2022
Core i5	12400F	6 (12)	—N/a	6 (12)	2.5	—N/a	4.4	—N/a	4.4	—N/a	—N/a			7.5 MB	18 MB	65	117	$ 167	LGA 1700	Q1 2022
Core i5	12400T	6 (12)	—N/a	6 (12)	1.8	—N/a	4.2	—N/a	4.2	—N/a	UHD 730	1.45 GHz	24	7.5 MB	18 MB	35	74	$ 192	LGA 1700	Q1 2022
Core i3	12300	4 (8)	—N/a	4 (8)	3.5	—N/a	4.4	—N/a	—N/a	—N/a	UHD 730	1.45 GHz	24	5 MB	12 MB	60	89	$ 143	LGA 1700	Q1 2022
Core i3	12300T	4 (8)	—N/a	4 (8)	2.3	—N/a	4.2	—N/a	—N/a	—N/a	UHD 730	1.45 GHz	24	5 MB	12 MB	35	69	$ 143	LGA 1700	Q1 2022
Core i3	12100	4 (8)	—N/a	4 (8)	3.3	—N/a	4.3	—N/a	—N/a	—N/a	UHD 730	1.45 GHz	24	5 MB	12 MB	60	89	$ 122	LGA 1700	Q1 2022
Core i3	12100F	4 (8)	—N/a	4 (8)	3.3	—N/a	4.3	—N/a	—N/a	—N/a	—N/a			5 MB	12 MB	60	89	$ 97	LGA 1700	Q1 2022
Core i3	12100T	4 (8)	—N/a	4 (8)	2.2	—N/a	4.1	—N/a	—N/a	—N/a	UHD 730	1.45 GHz	24	5 MB	12 MB	35	69	$ 122	LGA 1700	Q1 2022
Pentium	G7400	2 (4)	—N/a	2 (4)	3.7	—N/a	—N/a	—N/a	—N/a	—N/a	UHD 710	1.35 GHz	16	2.5 MB	6 MB	46	—N/a	$ 64	LGA 1700	Q1 2022
Pentium	G7400T	2 (4)	—N/a	2 (4)	3.1	—N/a	—N/a	—N/a	—N/a	—N/a	UHD 710	1.35 GHz	16	2.5 MB	6 MB	35	—N/a	$ 64	LGA 1700	Q1 2022
Celeron	G6900	2 (2)	—N/a	2 (2)	3.4	—N/a	—N/a	—N/a	—N/a	—N/a	UHD 710	1.3 GHz	16	2.5 MB	4 MB	46	—N/a	$ 42	LGA 1700	Q1 2022
Celeron	G6900T	2 (2)	—N/a	2 (2)	2.8	—N/a	—N/a	—N/a	—N/a	—N/a	UHD 710	1.3 GHz	16	2.5 MB	4 MB	35	—N/a	$ 42	LGA 1700	Q1 2022

==== Mobile ====
===== Repurposed Desktop =====
Underlined models support UDIMM ECC memory when paired with a WM690 chipset.

Core i5/i7/i9-12000HX Series (Codenamed "Alder Lake-HX")
Processor family	Model	Cores (Threads)			Clock rate (GHz)				Integrated graphics			Cache		TDP (W)		Price (USD)	Launch
Processor family	Model	Cores (Threads)			Base		Turbo		GPU	Max Clock	EUs	L2 cache	Smart cache	Base	Turbo	Price (USD)	Launch
Processor family	Model	P	E	Total	P	E	P	E	GPU	Max Clock	EUs	L2 cache	Smart cache	Base	Turbo	Price (USD)	Launch
Core i9	12950HX	8 (16)	8 (8)	16 (24)	2.3	1.7	5.0	3.6	UHD 770	1.55	32	14 MB	30 MB	45 W	157 W	$590	May 10, 2022
Core i9	12900HX	8 (16)	8 (8)	16 (24)	2.3	1.7	5.0	3.6	UHD 770	1.55	32	14 MB	30 MB	45 W	157 W	$688	May 10, 2022
Core i7	12850HX	8 (16)	8 (8)	16 (24)	2.1	1.5	4.8	3.4	UHD 770	1.45	32	14 MB	25 MB	45 W	157 W	$428	May 10, 2022
Core i7	12800HX	8 (16)	8 (8)	16 (24)	2.0	1.5	4.8	3.4	UHD 770	1.45	32	14 MB	25 MB	45 W	157 W	$502	May 10, 2022
Core i7	12650HX	6 (12)	8 (8)	14 (20)	2.0	1.5	4.7	3.3	UHD 770	1.45	32	11.5 MB	24 MB	45 W	157 W	$472	May 10, 2022
Core i5	12600HX	4 (8)	8 (8)	12 (16)	2.5	1.8	4.6	3.3	UHD 770	1.35	32	9 MB	18 MB	45 W	157 W	$284	May 10, 2022
Core i5	12450HX	4 (8)	4 (4)	8 (12)	2.4	1.8	4.4	3.1	UHD 710	16	1.3	12 MB	12 MB	45 W	157 W	$313	May 10, 2022

===== High Power =====
Core i5/i7/i9-12000H Series (Codenamed "Alder Lake-H")
Processor family	Model	Cores (Threads)			Clock rate (GHz)				Integrated graphics		Cache		TDP (W)		Price (USD)	Launch
Processor family	Model	Cores (Threads)			Base		Turbo		Max Clock	EUs	L2 cache	Smart cache	Base	Turbo	Price (USD)	Launch
Processor family	Model	P	E	Total	P	E	P	E	Max Clock	EUs	L2 cache	Smart cache	Base	Turbo	Price (USD)	Launch
Core i9	12900HK	6 (12)	8 (8)	14 (20)	2.5	1.8	5.0	3.8	1.45	95	11.5 MB	24 MB	35 W	115 W	$697	January 4, 2022
Core i9	12900H	6 (12)	8 (8)	14 (20)	2.5	1.8	5.0	3.8	1.45	95	11.5 MB	24 MB	35 W	115 W	$617	January 4, 2022
Core i7	12800H	6 (12)	8 (8)	14 (20)	2.4	1.8	4.8	3.7	1.4	95	11.5 MB	24 MB	35 W	115 W	$457	January 4, 2022
Core i7	12700H	6 (12)	8 (8)	14 (20)	2.3	1.7	4.7	3.5	1.4	95	11.5 MB	24 MB	35 W	115 W	$502	January 4, 2022
Core i7	12650H	6 (12)	4 (4)	10 (16)	2.3	1.7	4.7	3.5	1.4	64	5.5 MB	24 MB	35 W	115 W	$502	January 4, 2022
Core i5	12600H	4 (8)	8 (8)	12 (16)	2.7	2.0	4.5	3.3	1.4	80	9 MB	18 MB	35 W	95 W	$311	January 4, 2022
Core i5	12500H	4 (8)	8 (8)	12 (16)	2.5	1.8	4.5	3.3	1.3	80	9 MB	18 MB	35 W	95 W	$342	January 4, 2022
Core i5	12450H	4 (8)	4 (4)	8 (12)	2.0	1.5	4.4	3.3	1.2	48	7 MB	12 MB	35 W	95 W	$342	January 4, 2022

===== Balanced Power =====
Core i3/i5/i7-1200P Series (Codenamed "Alder Lake-P")
Processor family	Model	Cores (Threads)			Clock rate (GHz)				Integrated graphics		Cache		TDP (W)		Price (USD)	Launch
Processor family	Model	Cores (Threads)			Base		Turbo		Max Clock	EUs	L2 cache	Smart cache	Base	Turbo	Price (USD)	Launch
Processor family	Model	P	E	Total	P	E	P	E	Max Clock	EUs	L2 cache	Smart cache	Base	Turbo	Price (USD)	Launch
Core i7	1280P	6 (12)	8 (8)	14 (20)	1.8	1.3	4.8	3.6	1.45	96	11.5 MB	24 MB	28 W	64 W	$482	February 23, 2022
Core i7	1270P	4 (8)	8 (8)	12 (16)	2.2	1.6	4.8	3.5	1.4	96	9 MB	18 MB	28 W	64 W	$438	February 23, 2022
Core i7	1260P	4 (8)	8 (8)	12 (16)	2.1	1.5	4.7	3.4	1.4	96	9 MB	18 MB	28 W	64 W	$480	February 23, 2022
Core i5	1250P	4 (8)	8 (8)	12 (16)	1.7	1.2	4.4	3.3	1.4	80	9 MB	12 MB	28 W	64 W	$320	February 23, 2022
Core i5	1240P	4 (8)	8 (8)	12 (16)	1.7	1.2	4.4	3.3	1.3	80	9 MB	12 MB	28 W	64 W	$353	February 23, 2022
Core i3	1220P	2 (4)	8 (8)	10 (12)	1.5	1.1	4.4	3.3	1.1	64	7.5 MB	12 MB	28 W	64 W	$309	February 23, 2022

===== Low Power =====
Core i3/i5/i7-1205U Series (Codenamed "Alder Lake-U15")
Processor family	Model	Cores (Threads)			Clock rate (GHz)				Integrated graphics		Cache		TDP (W)		Price (USD)	Launch
Processor family	Model	Cores (Threads)			Base		Turbo		Max Clock	EUs	L2 cache	Smart cache	Base	Turbo	Price (USD)	Launch
Processor family	Model	P	E	Total	P	E	P	E	Max Clock	EUs	L2 cache	Smart cache	Base	Turbo	Price (USD)	Launch
Core i7	1265U	2 (4)	8 (8)	10 (12)	1.8	1.3	4.8	3.6	1.25	96	7.5 MB	12 MB	15 W	55 W	$426	February 23, 2022
Core i7	1255U	2 (4)	8 (8)	10 (12)	1.7	1.2	4.7	3.5	1.25	96	7.5 MB	12 MB	15 W	55 W	$426	February 23, 2022
Core i5	1245U	2 (4)	8 (8)	10 (12)	1.6	1.2	4.4	3.3	1.2	80	7.5 MB	12 MB	15 W	55 W	$309	February 23, 2022
Core i5	1230U	2 (4)	8 (8)	10 (12)	1.3	0.9	4.4	3.3	1.2	80	7.5 MB	12 MB	15 W	55 W	$309	February 23, 2022
Core i3	1215U	2 (4)	4 (4)	6 (8)	1.2	0.9	4.4	3.3	1.1	64	4.5 MB	10 MB	15 W	55 W	$281	February 23, 2022
Pentium	8505	1 (2)	4 (4)	5 (6)	1.2	0.9	4.4	3.3	0.9	48	3.125	8 MB	15 W	55 W	$161	February 23, 2022
Celeron	7305	1 (1)	4 (4)	5 (5)	1.2	0.9	—N/a		0.9	48	3.125	8 MB	15 W	55 W	$107	February 23, 2022

===== Ultra Low Power =====
Core i3/i5/i7-1200U Series (Codenamed "Alder Lake-U9")
Processor family	Model	Cores (Threads)			Clock rate (GHz)				Integrated graphics		Cache		TDP (W)		Price (USD)	Launch
Processor family	Model	Cores (Threads)			Base		Turbo		Max Clock	EUs	L2 cache	Smart cache	Base	Turbo	Price (USD)	Launch
Processor family	Model	P	E	Total	P	E	P	E	Max Clock	EUs	L2 cache	Smart cache	Base	Turbo	Price (USD)	Launch
Core i7	1260U	2 (4)	8 (8)	10 (12)	1.1	0.8	4.7	3.5	0.9	96	7.5 MB	12 MB	9 W	28 W	$426	February 23, 2022
Core i7	1250U	2 (4)	8 (8)	10 (12)	1.1	0.8	4.7	3.5	0.9	96	7.5 MB	12 MB	9 W	28 W	$426	February 23, 2022
Core i5	1240U	2 (4)	8 (8)	10 (12)	1.1	0.8	4.4	3.3	0.9	80	7.5 MB	12 MB	9 W	28 W	$309	February 23, 2022
Core i5	1230U	2 (4)	8 (8)	10 (12)	1.0	0.7	4.4	3.3	0.9	80	7.5 MB	12 MB	9 W	28 W	$309	February 23, 2022
Core i3	1210U	2 (4)	4 (4)	6 (8)	1.0	0.7	4.4	3.3	0.85	64	4.5 MB	10 MB	9 W	28 W	$281	February 23, 2022
Pentium	8505	1 (2)	4 (4)	5 (6)	1.0	0.7	4.4	3.3	0.7	48	3.125	8 MB	9 W	28 W	$161	February 23, 2022
Celeron	7305	1 (1)	4 (4)	5 (5)	1.0	0.7	—N/a		0.7	48	3.125	8 MB	9 W	28 W	$107	February 23, 2022

===== Value =====
These processors are E-core only.

N-Series (Codenamed "Alder Lake-N")
Processor family	Model	Cores (Threads)	Clock rate (GHz)		Integrated graphics		Smart Cache	TDP (W)		Price (USD)
Processor family	Model	Cores (Threads)	Base	Turbo	EUs	Max Clock	Smart Cache	Down	Base	Price (USD)
Core i3	N305	8 (8)	1.8	3.8	32	1.25	6 MB	9 W	15 W	$309
Core i3	N300	8 (8)	0.8	3.8	32	1.25	6 MB	Unknown	7 W	$309
Intel Processor	N200	4 (4)	1.0	3.7	32	0.75	6 MB	0.1 W	6 W	$193
Intel Processor	N100	4 (4)	0.8	3.4	24	0.75	6 MB	Unknown	6 W	$55
Intel Processor	N97	4 (4)	2.0	3.6	24	1.2	6 MB	Unknown	12 W	$128
Intel Processor	N95	4 (4)	1.7	3.4	16	1.2	6 MB	Unknown	15 W	Unknown
Intel Processor	N50	2 (2)	1.0	3.4	16	0.75	6 MB	Unknown	6 W	$128

Atom x7000E Series (Codenamed "Alder Lake-N")
Processor family	Model	Cores (Threads)	Clock rate (GHz)		Integrated graphics		Smart Cache	TDP (W)	Price (USD)
Processor family	Model	Cores (Threads)	Base	Turbo	EUs	Max Clock	Smart Cache	Base	Price (USD)
Atom	x7425E	4 (4)	1.5	3.4	24	1.0	6 MB	12 W	$58
Atom	x7213E	2 (2)	1.7	3.2	16	1.0	6 MB	10 W	$47
Atom	x7211E	2 (2)	1.0	3.2	16	1.0	6 MB	6 W	$39

=== 11th generation Core i ===
Released on September 2, 2020, 11th generation Intel Core i processors consisted of two separate architectures. Desktop processors were based on Rocket Lake which released on March 30, 2021 while mobile processors were based on Tiger Lake and launched on September 2, 2020.

==== Desktop ====
Rocket Lake based desktop parts are based on the Cypress Cove architecture, a 14nm backport of the 10nm Sunny Cove (microarchitecture) architecture.

Core i5/i7/i9-11000 Series (Codenamed "Rocket Lake-S")
Processor family	Model	Cores (threads)	Clock rate (GHz)				iGPU			Smart cache	TDP	Price (USD)	Socket	Launch
Processor family	Model	Cores (threads)	Base	Turbo			iGPU			Smart cache	TDP	Price (USD)	Socket	Launch
Processor family	Model	Cores (threads)	Base	All Core	2.0	3.0	GPU	Max Clock (GHz)	EUs	Smart cache	TDP	Price (USD)	Socket	Launch
Core i9	11900K	8 (16)	3.5	4.8	5.1	5.2	UHD 750	1.3	32	16 MB	125 W	$ 539	LGA 1200	March 30, 2021
Core i9	11900KF	8 (16)	3.5	4.8	5.1	5.2	—N/a			16 MB	125 W	$ 513	LGA 1200	March 30, 2021
Core i9	11900	8 (16)	2.5	4.7	5.0	5.1	UHD 750	1.3	32	16 MB	65 W	$ 439	LGA 1200	March 30, 2021
Core i9	11900F	8 (16)	2.5	4.7	5.0	5.1	—N/a			16 MB	65 W	$ 422	LGA 1200	March 30, 2021
Core i9	11900T	8 (16)	1.5	3.7	4.8	4.9	UHD 750	1.3	32	16 MB	35 W	$ 439	LGA 1200	March 30, 2021
Core i7	11700K	8 (16)	3.6	4.6	4.9	5.0	UHD 750	1.3	32	16 MB	125W	$ 399	LGA 1200	March 30, 2021
Core i7	11700KF	8 (16)	3.6	4.6	4.9	5.0	—N/a			16 MB	125W	$ 374	LGA 1200	March 30, 2021
Core i7	11700	8 (16)	2.5	4.4	4.8	4.9	UHD 750	1.3	32	16 MB	65W	$ 323	LGA 1200	March 30, 2021
Core i7	11700F	8 (16)	2.5	4.4	4.8	4.9	—N/a			16 MB	65W	$ 298	LGA 1200	March 30, 2021
Core i7	11700T	8 (16)	1.4	3.6	4.5	4.6	UHD 750	1.3	32	16 MB	35 W	$ 323	LGA 1200	March 30, 2021
Core i5	11600K	6 (12)	3.9	4.6	4.9	—N/a	UHD 750	1.3	32	12 MB	125 W	$ 262	LGA 1200	March 30, 2021
Core i5	11600KF	6 (12)	3.9	4.6	4.9	—N/a	—N/a			12 MB	125 W	$ 237	LGA 1200	March 30, 2021
Core i5	11600	6 (12)	2.8	4.3	4.8	—N/a	UHD 750	1.3	32	12 MB	65 W	$ 213	LGA 1200	March 30, 2021
Core i5	11600T	6 (12)	1.7	3.5	4.1	—N/a	UHD 750	1.3	32	12 MB	35 W	$ 213	LGA 1200	March 30, 2021
Core i5	11500	6 (12)	2.7	4.2	4.6	—N/a	UHD 750	1.3	32	12 MB	65 W	$ 192	LGA 1200	March 30, 2021
Core i5	11500T	6 (12)	1.5	3.4	3.9	—N/a	UHD 750	1.2	32	12 MB	35 W	$ 192	LGA 1200	March 30, 2021
Core i5	11400	6 (12)	2.6	4.2	4.4	—N/a	UHD 730	1.3	24	12 MB	65 W	$ 182	LGA 1200	March 30, 2021
Core i5	11400F	6 (12)	2.6	4.2	4.4	—N/a	—N/a			12 MB	65 W	$ 157	LGA 1200	March 30, 2021
Core i5	11400T	6 (12)	1.3	3.3	3.7	—N/a	UHD 730	1.2	24	12 MB	35 W	$ 182	LGA 1200	March 30, 2021

==== Mobile ====
These models are based on the Tiger Lake architecture which uses the 10nm Willow Cove microarchitecture. They have a configurable TDP which changes the base clock.

===== High Power =====
These processors are designed mobile workstations and support Intel vPro.

Xeon W-11055M Series (Codenamed "Tiger Lake-H")
Processor family	Model	Cores (threads)	Clock rate (GHz)				iGPU			Smart cache	TDP		Price (USD)	Launch
Processor family	Model	Cores (threads)	Base		Turbo		iGPU			Smart cache	TDP		Price (USD)	Launch
Processor family	Model	Cores (threads)	Min	Max	All Core	Max	GPU	Max Clock (GHz)	EUs	Smart cache	Min	Max	Price (USD)	Launch
Xeon W	11955M	8 (16)	2.1	2.6	4.5	5.0	UHD 770	1.45	32	24 MB	35 W	45 W	$623	September 2, 2020
Xeon W	11855M	6 (12)	2.6	3.2	4.4	4.9	UHD 770	1.45	32	18 MB	35 W	45 W	$450	September 2, 2020

Underlined models support Intel vPro.

Core i5/i7/i9-11000H Series (Codenamed "Tiger Lake-H")
Processor family	Model	Cores (threads)	Clock rate (GHz)				iGPU			Smart cache	TDP		Price (USD)	Launch
Processor family	Model	Cores (threads)	Base		Turbo		iGPU			Smart cache	TDP		Price (USD)	Launch
Processor family	Model	Cores (threads)	Min	Max	All Core	Max	GPU	Max Clock (GHz)	EUs	Smart cache	Min	Max	Price (USD)	Launch
Core i9	11980HK	8 (16)	2.6	3.3	4.5	5.0	UHD 770	1.45	32	24 MB	45 W	65 W	$583	September 20, 2020
Core i9	11950H	8 (16)	2.1	2.6	4.5	5.0	UHD 770	1.45	32	24 MB	35 W	45 W	$623	September 20, 2020
Core i9	11900H	8 (16)	2.1	2.5	4.4	4.9	UHD 770	1.45	32	24 MB	35 W	45 W	$546	September 20, 2020
Core i7	11850H	8 (16)	2.1	2.5	4.3	4.8	UHD 770	1.45	32	24 MB	35 W	45 W	$395	September 20, 2020
Core i7	11800H	8 (16)	1.9	2.3	4.2	4.6	UHD 770	1.45	32	24 MB	35 W	45 W	$395	May 11, 2021
Core i7	11600H	6 (12)	2.5	2.9	4.6		UHD 770	1.45	32	18 MB	35 W	45 W	$395	July 15, 2021
Core i5	11500H	6 (12)	2.4	2.9	4.2	4.6	UHD 770	1.45	32	12 MB	35 W	45 W	$250	May 11, 2021
Core i5	11400H	6 (12)	2.2	2.7	4.1	4.5	UHD 710	1.45	16	12 MB	35 W	45 W	$250	May 11, 2021
Core i5	11260H	6 (12)	2.1	2.6	4.0	4.4	UHD 710	1.4	16	12 MB	35 W	45 W	$250	May 11, 2021

===== High Power Thin and Light =====
Core i5/i7-11300H Series (Codenamed "Tiger Lake-H35")
Processor family	Model	Cores (threads)	Clock rate (GHz)				iGPU			Smart cache	TDP		Price (USD)	Launch
Processor family	Model	Cores (threads)	Base		Turbo		iGPU			Smart cache	TDP		Price (USD)	Launch
Processor family	Model	Cores (threads)	Min	Max	All Core	Max	GPU	Max Clock (GHz)	EUs	Smart cache	Min	Max	Price (USD)	Launch
Core i7	11390H	4 (8)	2.9	3.4	4.6	5.0	Iris Xe Graphics	1.4	96	12 MB	28 W	35 W	$426	June 21, 2021
Core i7	11375H	4 (8)	3.0	3.3	4.3	5.0	Iris Xe Graphics	1.35	96	12 MB	28 W	35 W	$482	January 11, 2021
Core i7	11370H	4 (8)	3.0	3.3	4.3	4.8	Iris Xe Graphics	1.35	96	12 MB	28 W	35 W	$426	January 11, 2021
Core i5	11320H	4 (8)	2.5	3.2	4.3	4.5	Iris Xe Graphics	1.35	96	8 MB	28 W	35 W	$309	June 21, 2021
Core i5	11300H	4 (8)	2.6	3.1	4.0	4.4	Iris Xe Graphics	1.3	80	8 MB	28 W	35 W	$309	January 11, 2021

===== Low Power =====
These models support DDR4-3200 and LPDDR4X-4267 memory. Underlined models support Intel vPro.

Core i5/i7-1105G7 Series (Codenamed "Tiger Lake-UP3")
Processor family	Model	Cores (threads)	Clock rate (GHz)				iGPU			Smart cache	TDP		Price (USD)	Launch
Processor family	Model	Cores (threads)	Base		Turbo		iGPU			Smart cache	TDP		Price (USD)	Launch
Processor family	Model	Cores (threads)	Min	Max	All Core	Max	GPU	Max Clock (GHz)	EUs	Smart cache	Min	Max	Price (USD)	Launch
Core i7	1195G7	4 (8)	1.3	2.9	4.6	5.0	Iris Xe G7	1.4	96	12 MB	12 W	28 W	May 20, 2021	$426
Core i7	1185G7	4 (8)	1.2	3.0	4.3	4.8	Iris Xe G7	1.35	96	12 MB	12 W	28 W	September 2, 2020	$426
Core i7	1165G7	4 (8)	1.2	2.8	4.1	4.7	Iris Xe G7	1.3	96	12 MB	12 W	28 W	September 2, 2020	$426
Core i5	1155G7	4 (8)	1.0	2.5	4.3	4.5	Iris Xe G7	1.35	80	8 MB	12 W	28 W	May 20, 2021	$309
Core i5	1145G7	4 (8)	1.1	2.6	3.8	4.4	Iris Xe G7	1.3	80	8 MB	12 W	28 W	January 11, 2021	$309
Core i5	1135G7	4 (8)	0.9	2.4	3.8	4.2	Iris Xe G7	1.3	80	8 MB	12 W	28 W	September 20, 2020	$309

These models support DDR4-3200 and LPDDR4X-3733 memory. Underlined models support Intel vPro.

Core i3-1105G4/Pentium Gold 7505/Celeron 6305 Series (Codenamed "Tiger Lake-UP3")
Processor family	Model	Cores (threads)	Clock rate (GHz)				iGPU			Smart cache	TDP		Price (USD)	Launch
Processor family	Model	Cores (threads)	Base		Turbo		iGPU			Smart cache	TDP		Price (USD)	Launch
Processor family	Model	Cores (threads)	Min	Max	All Core	Max	GPU	Max Clock (GHz)	EUs	Smart cache	Min	Max	Price (USD)	Launch
Core i3	1125G4	4 (8)	0.9	2.0	3.3	3.7	UHD G4	1.25	48	8 MB	12 W	28 W	$281	September 2, 2020
Core i3	1115G4	2 (4)	1.7	3.0	4.1		UHD G4	1.25	48	6 MB	12 W	28 W	$281	September 2, 2020
Pentium Gold	7505	2 (4)	2.0		3.5		UHD G4	1.25	48	4 MB	15 W		$161	September 2, 2020
Celeron	6505	2 (2)	1.8		—N/a		UHD G4	1.25	48	4 MB	15 W		$107	September 2, 2020

===== Ultra Low Power =====
These models support LPDDR4X-4267 memory. Underlined models support Intel vPro.

Core i3/i5/i7-1100G7/G4 Series (Codenamed "Tiger Lake-UP4")
Processor family	Model	Cores (threads)	Clock rate (GHz)				iGPU			Smart cache	TDP		Price (USD)	Launch
Processor family	Model	Cores (threads)	Base		Turbo		iGPU			Smart cache	TDP		Price (USD)	Launch
Processor family	Model	Cores (threads)	Min	Max	All Core	Max	GPU	Max Clock (GHz)	EUs	Smart cache	Min	Max	Price (USD)	Launch
Core i7	1180G7	4 (8)	0.9	2.2	3.7	4.6	Iris Xe G7	1.1	96	12 MB	7 W	15 W	$426	January 11, 2021
Core i7	1160G7	4 (8)	0.9	2.1	3.6	4.4	Iris Xe G7	1.1	96	12 MB	7 W	15 W	$426	September 2, 2020
Core i5	1140G7	4 (8)	0.8	1.8	4.2		Iris Xe G7	1.1	80	8 MB	7 W	15 W	$309	January 11, 2021
Core i5	1130G7	4 (8)	0.8	1.8	3.4	4.0	Iris Xe G7	1.1	80	8 MB	7 W	15 W	$309	September 2, 2020
Core i3	1120G4	4 (8)	0.8	1.5	3.0	3.5	UHD G4	1.1	48	8 MB	7 W	15 W	$281	September 2, 2020
Core i3	1110G4	2 (4)	1.5	2.5	3.9		UHD G4	1.1	48	6 MB	7 W	15 W	$281	September 2, 2020

=== 10th generation Core i ===
==== Desktop (codenamed "Comet Lake") ====
Pentium and Celeron CPUs lack AVX and AVX2 support.

Processor branding	Model	Cores	Threads	CPU clock rate (GHz)					GPU		Smart cache (L3)	TDP		Memory support	Price (USD)
Processor branding	Model	Cores	Threads	Base	Turbo Boost				Model	Max clock rate (GHz)	Smart cache (L3)	TDP		Memory support	Price (USD)
Processor branding	Model	Cores	Threads	Base	All-Core	2.0	3.0	TVB	Model	Max clock rate (GHz)	Smart cache (L3)	Base	Down	Memory support	Price (USD)
Core i9	10900K	10	20	3.7	4.8	5.1	5.2	5.3	UHD 630	1.20	20 MB (Note: Transistorized memory, such as RAM, ROM, flash and cache sizes as well as file sizes are specified using binary meanings for K (1024^{1}), M (1024^{2}), G (1024^{3}), etc.)	125 W	95 W	DDR4-2933 up to 128 GB	$488
Core i9	10900KF	10	20	3.7	4.8	5.1	5.2	5.3	—N/a		20 MB	125 W	95 W	DDR4-2933 up to 128 GB	$472
Core i9	10910	10	20	3.6	4.7	5.0	—N/a	—N/a	UHD 630	1.2	20 MB	125 W	95 W	DDR4-2933 up to 128 GB	OEM
Core i9	10900	10	20	2.8	4.5	5.0	5.1	5.2	UHD 630	1.2	20 MB	65 W	—N/a	DDR4-2933 up to 128 GB	$438
Core i9	10900F	10	20	2.8	4.5	5.0	5.1	5.2	—N/a		20 MB	65 W	—N/a	DDR4-2933 up to 128 GB	$422
Core i9	10900T	10	20	1.9	3.7	4.5	4.6	—N/a	UHD 630	1.2	20 MB	35 W	25 W	DDR4-2933 up to 128 GB	$438
Core i9	10850K	10	20	3.6	4.8	5.0	5.1	5.2	UHD 630	1.2	20 MB	125 W	95 W	DDR4-2933 up to 128 GB	$453
Core i7	10700K	8	16	3.8	4.7	5.0	5.1	—N/a	UHD 630	1.2	16 MB	125 W	95 W	DDR4-2933 up to 128 GB	$374
Core i7	10700KF	8	16	3.8	4.7	5.0	5.1	—N/a	—N/a		16 MB	125 W	95 W	DDR4-2933 up to 128 GB	$349
Core i7	10700	8	16	2.9	4.6	4.7	4.8	—N/a	UHD 630	1.2	16 MB	65 W	—N/a	DDR4-2933 up to 128 GB	$323
Core i7	10700F	8	16	2.9	4.6	4.7	4.8	—N/a	—N/a		16 MB	65 W	—N/a	DDR4-2933 up to 128 GB	$298
Core i7	10700T	8	16	2.0	3.7	4.4	4.5	—N/a	UHD 630	1.2	16 MB	35 W	25 W	DDR4-2933 up to 128 GB	$325
Core i5	10600K	6	12	4.1	4.5	4.8	—N/a	—N/a	UHD 630	1.2	12 MB	125 W	95 W	DDR4-2666 up to 128 GB	$262
Core i5	10600KF	6	12	4.1	4.5	4.8	—N/a	—N/a	—N/a		12 MB	125 W	95 W	DDR4-2666 up to 128 GB	$237
Core i5	10600	6	12	3.3	4.4	4.8	—N/a	—N/a	UHD 630	1.2	12 MB	65 W	—N/a	DDR4-2666 up to 128 GB	$213
Core i5	10600T	6	12	2.4	3.7	4.0	—N/a	—N/a	UHD 630	1.2	12 MB	35 W	25 W	DDR4-2666 up to 128 GB	$213
Core i5	10500	6	12	3.1	4.2	4.5	—N/a	—N/a	UHD 630	1.15	12 MB	65 W	—N/a	DDR4-2666 up to 128 GB	$192
Core i5	10500T	6	12	2.3	3.5	3.8	—N/a	—N/a	UHD 630	1.15	12 MB	35 W	25 W	DDR4-2666 up to 128 GB	$192
Core i5	10400	6	12	2.9	4.0	4.3	—N/a	—N/a	UHD 630	1.1	12 MB	65 W	—N/a	DDR4-2666 up to 128 GB	$182
Core i5	10400F	6	12	2.9	4.0	4.3	—N/a	—N/a	—N/a		12 MB	65 W	—N/a	DDR4-2666 up to 128 GB	$157
Core i5	10400T	6	12	2.0	3.2	3.6	—N/a	—N/a	UHD 630	1.1	12 MB	35 W	25 W	DDR4-2666 up to 128 GB	$182
Core i3	10320	4	8	3.8	4.4	4.6	—N/a	—N/a	UHD 630	1.15	8 MB	65 W	—N/a	DDR4-2666 up to 128 GB	$154
Core i3	10300	4	8	3.7	4.2	4.4	—N/a	—N/a	UHD 630	1.15	8 MB	65 W	—N/a	DDR4-2666 up to 128 GB	$143
Core i3	10300T	4	8	3.0	3.6	3.9	—N/a	—N/a	UHD 630	1.1	8 MB	35 W	25 W	DDR4-2666 up to 128 GB	$143
Core i3	10100	4	8	3.6	4.1	4.3	—N/a	—N/a	UHD 630	1.1	6 MB	65 W	—N/a	DDR4-2666 up to 128 GB	$122
Core i3	10100F	4	8	3.6	4.1	4.3	—N/a	—N/a	—N/a		6 MB	65 W	—N/a	DDR4-2666 up to 128 GB	$79
Core i3	10100T	4	8	3.0	3.5	3.8	—N/a	—N/a	UHD 630	1.1	6 MB	35 W	25 W	DDR4-2666 up to 128 GB	$122
Pentium; Gold	G6600	2	4	4.2	—N/a		—N/a	—N/a	UHD 630	1.1	4 MB	58 W	—N/a	DDR4-2666 up to 128 GB	$86
Pentium; Gold	G6500	2	4	4.1	—N/a		—N/a	—N/a	UHD 630	1.1	4 MB	58 W	—N/a	DDR4-2666 up to 128 GB	$75
Pentium; Gold	G6500T	2	4	3.5	—N/a		—N/a	—N/a	UHD 630	1.05	4 MB	35 W	25 W	DDR4-2666 up to 128 GB	$75
Pentium; Gold	G6400	2	4	4.0	—N/a		—N/a	—N/a	UHD 610	1.05	4 MB	58 W	—N/a	DDR4-2666 up to 128 GB	$64
Pentium; Gold	G6400T	2	4	3.4	—N/a		—N/a	—N/a	UHD 610	1.05	4 MB	35 W	25 W	DDR4-2666 up to 128 GB	$64
Celeron	G5925	2	2	3.6	—N/a		—N/a	—N/a	UHD 610	1.05	4 MB	58 W	—N/a	DDR4-2666 up to 128 GB	$52
Celeron	G5920	2	2	3.5	—N/a		—N/a	—N/a	UHD 610	1.05	2 MB	58 W	—N/a	DDR4-2666 up to 128 GB	$52
Celeron	G5905	2	2	3.5	—N/a		—N/a	—N/a	UHD 610	1.05	4 MB	58 W	—N/a	DDR4-2666 up to 128 GB	$42
Celeron	G5905T	2	2	3.3	—N/a		—N/a	—N/a	UHD 610	1.0	4 MB	35 W	25 W	DDR4-2666 up to 128 GB	$42
Celeron	G5900	2	2	3.4	—N/a		—N/a	—N/a	UHD 610	1.05	2 MB	58 W	—N/a	DDR4-2666 up to 128 GB	$42
Celeron	G5900T	2	2	3.2	—N/a		—N/a	—N/a	UHD 610	1.0	2 MB	35 W	25 W	DDR4-2666 up to 128 GB	$42

==== Mobile (codenamed "Comet Lake", "Ice Lake", and "Amber Lake") ====
Processor family	Model	Cores	Threads	Clock rate (GHz)		Cache			IGP			TDP	Codename	Socket	Release
Processor family	Model	Cores	Threads	Base	Max. turbo	L1	L2	L3	Processor	Clock rate (MHz)		TDP	Codename	Socket	Release
Processor family	Model	Cores	Threads	Base	Max. turbo	L1	L2	L3	Processor	Base	Max. dynamic	TDP	Codename	Socket	Release
Core i7	10750H	6	12	2.60	5.00	384KB	1.5MB	12MB	UHD	350	1150	45 W	Comet Lake	BGA 1440	Q1 2020
Core i7	10710U	6	12	1.10	4.70	384KB	1.5MB	12MB	UHD	300	1150	15 W	Comet Lake	BGA 1528	Q3 2019
Core i7	1065G7	4	8	1.30	3.90	256KB	1MB	8MB	Iris Plus	300	1100	15 W	Ice Lake	BGA 1526	Q3 2019
Core i7	10610U	4	8	1.80	4.90	256KB	1MB	8MB	UHD	300	1150	15 W	Comet Lake	BGA 1528	Q2 2020
Core i7	1060G7	4	8	1.00	3.80	256KB	1MB	8MB	Iris Plus	300	1100	9 W	Ice Lake	BGA 1377	Q3 2019
Core i7	10510U	4	8	1.80	4.90	256KB	1MB	8MB	UHD	300	1150	15 W	Comet Lake	BGA 1528	Q3 2019
Core i7	10510Y	4	8	1.20	4.50	256KB	1MB	8MB	UHD	300	1150	7 W	Amber Lake Y	BGA 1377	Q3 2019
Core i5	10500H	6	12	2.50	4.50	384KB	1.5MB	12MB	UHD	350	1050	45 W	Comet Lake	BGA 1440	Q4 2020
Core i5	10300H	4	8	2.50	4.50	256KB	1MB	8MB	UHD	350	1050	45 W	Comet Lake	BGA 1440	Q4 2020
Core i5	10210U	4	8	1.60	4.20	256KB	1MB	6MB	UHD 620	300	1100	15 W	Comet Lake	BGA 1528	Q3 2019
Core i3	10110Y	2	4	1.00	4.00	128KB	512KB	4MB	UHD 615	300	1000	7 W	Amber Lake Y	BGA 1377	Q3 2019
Core i3	1005G1	2	4	1.20	3.40	128KB	512KB	4MB	UHD G1	300	900	15 W	Ice Lake	BGA 1526	Q3 2019

=== 9th generation Core i ===
==== Desktop (codenamed "Coffee Lake Refresh") ====
Processor family	Model	Cores	Threads	Clock rate (GHz)		Cache			IGP			TDP	Codename	Socket	Release
Processor family	Model	Cores	Threads	Base	Max. turbo	L1	L2	L3	processor	Clock rate (MHz)		TDP	Codename	Socket	Release
Processor family	Model	Cores	Threads	Base	Max. turbo	L1	L2	L3	processor	Base	Max. dynamic	TDP	Codename	Socket	Release
Core i9	9900KS	8	16	4.00	5.00	512KB	2MB	16MB	UHD 630	350	1200	127 W	Coffee Lake	LGA 1151	Q4 2019
Core i9	9900K	8	16	3.60	5.00	512KB	2MB	16MB	UHD 630	350	1200	95 W	Coffee Lake	LGA 1151	Q4 2018
Core i9	9900	8	16	3.10	5.00	512KB	2MB	16MB	UHD 630	350	1200	65 W	Coffee Lake	LGA 1151	Q2 2019
Core i9	9900T	8	16	2.10	4.40	512KB	2MB	16MB	UHD 630	350	1200	35 W	Coffee Lake	LGA 1151	Q2 2019
Core i7	9700K	8	8	3.60	4.90	512KB	2MB	12MB	UHD 630	350	1200	95 W	Coffee Lake	LGA 1151	Q4 2018
Core i7	9700KF	8	8	3.60	4.90	512KB	2MB	12MB	—N/a	—N/a	—N/a	95 W	Coffee Lake	LGA 1151	Q1 2019
Core i7	9700	8	8	3.00	4.70	512KB	2MB	12MB	UHD 630	350	1200	65 W	Coffee Lake	LGA 1151	Q2 2019
Core i7	9700F	8	8	3.00	4.70	512KB	2MB	12MB	—N/a	—N/a	—N/a	65 W	Coffee Lake	LGA 1151	Q2 2019
Core i7	9700E	8	8	2.60	4.40	512KB	2MB	12MB	UHD 630	350	1150	65 W	Coffee Lake	LGA 1151	Q2 2019
Core i7	9700T	8	8	2.00	4.30	512KB	2MB	12MB	UHD 630	350	1200	35 W	Coffee Lake	LGA 1151	Q2 2019
Core i7	9700TE	8	8	1.80	3.80	512KB	2MB	12MB	UHD 630	350	1150	35 W	Coffee Lake	LGA 1151	Q2 2019
Core i5	9600K	6	6	3.70	4.60	384KB	1.5MB	9MB	UHD 630	350	1150	95 W	Coffee Lake	LGA 1151	Q4 2018
Core i5	9600KF	6	6	3.70	4.60	384KB	1.5MB	9MB	—N/a	—N/a	—N/a	95 W	Coffee Lake	LGA 1151	Q1 2019
Core i5	9600	6	6	3.10	4.60	384KB	1.5MB	9MB	UHD 630	350	1150	65 W	Coffee Lake	LGA 1151	Q2 2019
Core i5	9600T	6	6	2.30	3.90	384KB	1.5MB	9MB	UHD 630	350	1150	35 W	Coffee Lake	LGA 1151	Q2 2019
Core i5	9500	6	6	3.00	4.40	384KB	1.5MB	9MB	UHD 630	350	1100	65 W	Coffee Lake	LGA 1151	Q2 2019
Core i5	9500F	6	6	3.00	4.40	384KB	1.5MB	9MB	—N/a	—N/a	—N/a	65 W	Coffee Lake	LGA 1151	Q2 2019
Core i5	9500E	6	6	3.00	4.20	384KB	1.5MB	9MB	UHD 630	350	1100	65 W	Coffee Lake	LGA 1151	Q2 2019
Core i5	9500T	6	6	2.20	3.70	384KB	1.5MB	9MB	UHD 630	350	1100	35 W	Coffee Lake	LGA 1151	Q2 2019
Core i5	9500TE	6	6	2.20	3.60	384KB	1.5MB	9MB	UHD 630	350	1100	35 W	Coffee Lake	LGA 1151	Q2 2019
Core i5	9400	6	6	2.90	4.10	384KB	1.5MB	9MB	UHD 630	350	1050	65 W	Coffee Lake	LGA 1151	Q2 2019
Core i5	9400F	6	6	2.90	4.10	384KB	1.5MB	9MB	—N/a	—N/a	—N/a	65 W	Coffee Lake	LGA 1151	Q1 2019
Core i5	9400T	6	6	1.80	3.40	384KB	1.5MB	9MB	UHD 630	350	1050	35 W	Coffee Lake	LGA 1151	Q2 2019
Core i3	9350K	4	4	4.00	4.60	256KB	1MB	8MB	UHD 630	350	1150	91 W	Coffee Lake	LGA 1151	Q1 2019
Core i3	9350KF	4	4	4.00	4.60	256KB	1MB	8MB	—N/a	—N/a	—N/a	91 W	Coffee Lake	LGA 1151	Q1 2019
Core i3	9320	4	4	3.70	4.40	256KB	1MB	8MB	UHD 630	350	1150	65 W	Coffee Lake	LGA 1151	Q2 2019
Core i3	9300	4	4	3.70	4.30	256KB	1MB	8MB	UHD 630	350	1150	65 W	Coffee Lake	LGA 1151	Q2 2019
Core i3	9300T	4	4	3.20	3.80	256KB	1MB	8MB	UHD 630	350	1100	35 W	Coffee Lake	LGA 1151	Q2 2019
Core i3	9100	4	4	3.60	4.20	256KB	1MB	6MB	UHD 630	350	1100	65 W	Coffee Lake	LGA 1151	Q2 2019
Core i3	9100E	4	4	3.10	3.70	256KB	1MB	6MB	UHD 630	350	1050	65 W	Coffee Lake	LGA 1151	Q2 2019
Core i3	9100F	4	4	3.60	4.20	256KB	1MB	6MB	—N/a	—N/a	—N/a	65 W	Coffee Lake	LGA 1151	Q2 2019
Core i3	9100T	4	4	3.10	3.70	256KB	1MB	6MB	UHD 630	350	1100	35 W	Coffee Lake	LGA 1151	Q2 2019
Core i3	9100TE	4	4	2.20	3.20	256KB	1MB	6MB	UHD 630	350	1050	35 W			Q2 2019

=== 8th generation Core i ===
==== Desktop (codenamed "Coffee Lake") ====
Processor family	Model	Cores	Threads	Clock rate (GHz)		Cache			IGP			TDP	Codename	Socket	Release
Processor family	Model	Cores	Threads	Base	Max. turbo	L1	L2	L3	Processor	Clock rate (MHz)		TDP	Codename	Socket	Release
Processor family	Model	Cores	Threads	Base	Max. turbo	L1	L2	L3	Processor	Base	Max. dynamic	TDP	Codename	Socket	Release
Core i7	8086K	6	12	4.00	5.00	384KB	1.5MB	12MB	UHD 630	350	1200	95 W	Coffee Lake	LGA 1151	Q2 2018
Core i7	8700K	6	12	3.70	4.70	384KB	1.5MB	12MB	UHD 630	350	1200	95 W	Coffee Lake	LGA 1151	Q4 2017
Core i7	8700	6	12	3.20	4.60	384KB	1.5MB	12MB	UHD 630	350	1200	65 W	Coffee Lake	LGA 1151	Q4 2017
Core i7	8700T	6	12	2.40	4.00	384KB	1.5MB	12MB	UHD 630	350	1200	35 W	Coffee Lake	LGA 1151	Q2 2018
Core i5	8600K	6	6	3.60	4.30	384KB	1.5MB	9MB	UHD 630	350	1150	95 W	Coffee Lake	LGA 1151	Q4 2017
Core i5	8600	6	6	3.10	4.30	384KB	1.5MB	9MB	UHD 630	350	1150	65 W	Coffee Lake	LGA 1151	Q1 2018
Core i5	8600T	6	6	2.30	3.70	384KB	1.5MB	9MB	UHD 630	350	1150	35 W	Coffee Lake	LGA 1151	Q2 2017
Core i5	8500	6	6	3.00	4.10	384KB	1.5MB	9MB	UHD 630	350	1100	65 W	Coffee Lake	LGA 1151	Q2 2018
Core i5	8500T	6	6	2.10	3.50	384KB	1.5MB	9MB	UHD 630	350	1100	35 W	Coffee Lake	LGA 1151	Q2 2018
Core i5	8400	6	6	2.80	4.00	384KB	1.5MB	9MB	UHD 630	350	1050	65 W	Coffee Lake	LGA 1151	Q4 2017
Core i5	8400T	6	6	1.70	3.30	384KB	1.5MB	9MB	UHD 630	350	1050	35 W	Coffee Lake	LGA 1151	Q2 2018
Core i3	8350K	4	4	4.00	—N/a	256KB	1MB	8MB	UHD 630	350	1150	91 W	Coffee Lake	LGA 1151	Q4 2017
Core i3	8100	4	4	3.60	—N/a	256KB	1MB	6MB	UHD 630	350	1100	65 W	Coffee Lake	LGA 1151	Q4 2017
Core i3	8100T	4	4	3.10	—N/a	256KB	1MB	6MB	UHD 630	350	1100	35 W	Coffee Lake	LGA 1151	Q2 2018

==== Mobile (codenamed "Coffee Lake", "Amber Lake" and "Whiskey Lake") ====
Processor family	Model	Cores	Threads	Clock rate (GHz)		Cache			IGP			TDP	Codename	Socket	Release
Processor family	Model	Cores	Threads	base	max turbo	L1	L2	L3	Processor	Clock rate (MHz)		TDP	Codename	Socket	Release
Processor family	Model	Cores	Threads	base	max turbo	L1	L2	L3	Processor	Base	Max. dynamic	TDP	Codename	Socket	Release
Core i9	8950HK	6	12	2.90	4.80	384KB	1.5MB	12MB	UHD 630	350	1200	45 W	Coffee Lake	BGA 1440	Q2 2018
Core i7	8850H	6	12	2.60	4.30	384KB	1.5MB	9MB	UHD 630	350	1150	45 W	Coffee Lake	BGA 1440	Q2 2018
Core i7	8750H	6	12	2.20	4.10	384KB	1.5MB	9MB	UHD 630	350	1100	45 W	Coffee Lake	BGA 1440	Q2 2018
Core i7	8700B	6	12	3.20	4.60	384KB	1.5MB	12MB	UHD 630	350	1200	65 W	Coffee Lake	BGA 1440	Q2 2018
Core i7	8665U	4	8	1.90	4.80	256KB	1MB	8MB	UHD 620	300	1150	15 W	Whiskey Lake	BGA 1528	Q2 2019
Core i7	8650U	4	8	1.90	4.20	256KB	1MB	8MB	UHD 620	300	1150	15 W	Kaby Lake R	BGA 1356	Q3 2017
Core i7	8569U	4	8	2.80	4.70	256KB	1MB	8MB	Iris Plus 655	300	1200	28 W	Coffee Lake	BGA 1528	Q2 2019
Core i7	8565U	4	8	1.80	4.60	256KB	1MB	8MB	UHD 620	300	1150	15 W	Whiskey Lake	BGA 1528	Q3 2018
Core i7	8559U	4	8	2.70	4.50	256KB	1MB	8MB	Iris Plus 655	300	1200	28 W	Coffee Lake	BGA 1528	Q2 2018
Core i7	8557U	4	8	1.70	4.50	256KB	1MB	8MB	Iris Plus 645	300	1150	15 W	Coffee Lake	BGA 1528	Q3 2019
Core i7	8550U	4	8	1.80	4.00	256KB	1MB	8MB	UHD 620	300	1150	15 W	Kaby Lake R	BGA 1356	Q3 2017
Core i7	8500Y	2	4	1.50	4.20	128KB	512KB	4MB	UHD 615	300	1050	5 W	Amber Lake Y	BGA 1515	Q1 2019
Core i5	8500B	6	6	3.00	4.10	384KB	1.5MB	9MB	UHD 630	350	1100	65 W	Coffee Lake	BGA 1440	Q2 2018
Core i5	8400H	4	8	2.50	4.20	256KB	1MB	8MB	UHD 630	350	1100	45 W	Coffee Lake	BGA 1440	Q2 2018
Core i5	8400B	6	6	2.80	4.00	384KB	1.5MB	9MB	UHD 630	350	1050	65 W	Coffee Lake	BGA 1440	Q2 2018
Core i5	8365U	4	8	1.60	4.10	256KB	1MB	6MB	UHD 620	300	1100	15 W	Whiskey Lake	BGA 1528	Q2 2019
Core i5	8350U	4	8	1.70	3.60	256KB	1MB	6MB	UHD 620	300	1100	15 W	Kaby Lake R	BGA 1356	Q3 2017
Core i5	8310Y	2	4	1.60	3.90	128KB	512KB	4MB	UHD 617	300	1050	7 W	Amber Lake Y	BGA 1515	Q1 2019
Core i5	8300H	4	8	2.30	4.00	256KB	1MB	8MB	UHD 630	350	1000	45 W	Coffee Lake	BGA 1440	Q2 2018
Core i5	8279U	4	8	2.40	4.10	256KB	1MB	6MB	Iris Plus 655	300	1000	28 W	Coffee Lake	BGA 1440	Q2 2019
Core i5	8269U	4	8	2.60	4.20	256KB	1MB	6MB	Iris Plus 655	300	1100	28 W	Coffee Lake	BGA 1528	Q2 2018
Core i5	8265U	4	8	1.60	3.90	256KB	1MB	6MB	UHD 620	300	1100	15 W	Whiskey Lake	BGA 1528	Q3 2018
Core i5	8260U	4	8	1.60	3.90	256KB	1MB	6MB	UHD 620	300	1100	15 W	Coffee Lake	BGA 1528	Q4 2019
Core i5	8259U	4	8	2.30	3.80	256KB	1MB	6MB	Iris Plus 655	300	1050	28 W	Coffee Lake	BGA 1528	Q2 2018
Core i5	8257U	4	8	1.40	3.90	256KB	1MB	6MB	Iris Plus 645	300	1050	15W	Coffee Lake	BGA 1528	Q3 2019
Core i5	8250U	4	8	1.60	3.40	256KB	1MB	6MB	UHD 620	300	1100	15W	Kaby Lake R	BGA 1356	Q3 2017
Core i5	8210Y	2	4	1.60	3.60	128KB	512KB	4MB	UHD 617	300	1050	7 W	Amber Lake Y	BGA 1515	Q1 2019
Core i5	8200Y	2	4	1.30	3.90	128KB	512KB	4MB	UHD 615	300	950	5 W	Amber Lake Y	BGA 1515	Q3 2018
Core i3	8145U	2	4	2.10	3.90	128KB	512KB	4MB	UHD 620	300	1000	15 W	Whiskey Lake	BGA 1528	Q3 2018
Core i3	8140U	2	4	2.10	3.90	128KB	512KB	4MB	UHD 620	300	1000	15 W	Coffee Lake	BGA 1528	Q4 2019
Core i3	8130U	2	4	2.20	3.40	128KB	512KB	4MB	UHD 620	300	1000	15 W	Kaby Lake R	BGA 1356	Q1 2018
Core i3	8109U	2	4	3.00	3.60	128KB	512KB	4MB	Iris Plus 655	300	1050	28 W	Coffee Lake	BGA 1528	Q2 2018
Core i3	8100H	4	4	3.00	—N/a	256KB	1MB	6MB	UHD 630	350	1000	45 W	Coffee Lake	BGA 1440	Q3 2018
Core i3	8100B	4	4	3.60	—N/a	256KB	1MB	6MB	UHD 630	350	1050	65 W	Coffee Lake	BGA 1440	Q3 2018
Core m3	8100Y	2	4	1.10	3.40	128KB	512KB	4MB	UHD 615	300	900	5 W	Amber Lake Y	BGA 1515	Q3 2018

=== 7th generation Core i ===
==== Desktop (codenamed "Kaby Lake" and "Skylake-X") ====
Processor family	Model	Cores	Threads	Clock rate (GHz)		Cache			IGP			TDP	Codename	Socket	Release
Processor family	Model	Cores	Threads	Base	Max. turbo	L1	L2	L3	Processor	Clock rate (MHz)		TDP	Codename	Socket	Release
Processor family	Model	Cores	Threads	Base	Max. turbo	L1	L2	L3	Processor	Base	Max. dynamic	TDP	Codename	Socket	Release
Core i9	7980XE	18	36	2.60	4.20	1.15MB	18MB	24.75MB	—N/a	—N/a	—N/a	165 W	Skylake	LGA 2066	Q3 2017
Core i9	7960X	16	32	2.80	4.20	1MB	16MB	22MB	—N/a	—N/a	—N/a	165 W	Skylake	LGA 2066	Q3 2017
Core i9	7940X	14	28	3.10	4.30	896KB	14MB	19.25MB	—N/a	—N/a	—N/a	165 W	Skylake	LGA 2066	Q3 2017
Core i9	7920X	12	24	2.90	4.30	768KB	12MB	16.50MB	—N/a	—N/a	—N/a	140 W	Skylake	LGA 2066	Q3 2017
Core i9	7900X	10	20	3.30	4.30	640KB	10MB	13.75MB	—N/a	—N/a	—N/a	140 W	Skylake	LGA 2066	Q2 2017
Core i7	7820X	8	16	3.60	4.30	512KB	8MB	11MB	—N/a	—N/a	—N/a	140 W	Skylake	LGA 2066	Q2 2017
Core i7	7800X	6	12	3.50	4.00	384KB	6MB	8.25MB	—N/a	—N/a	—N/a	140 W	Skylake	LGA 2066	Q2 2017
Core i7	7740X	4	8	4.30	4.50	256KB	1MB	8MB	—N/a	—N/a	—N/a	112 W	Kaby Lake	LGA 2066	Q1 2017
Core i7	7700K	4	8	4.20	4.50	256KB	1MB	8MB	HD 630	350	1150	91 W	Kaby Lake	LGA 1151	Q1 2017
Core i7	7700	4	8	3.60	4.20	256KB	1MB	8MB	HD 630	350	1150	65 W	Kaby Lake	LGA 1151	Q1 2017
Core i7	7700T	4	8	2.90	3.80	256KB	1MB	8MB	HD 630	350	1150	35 W	Kaby Lake	LGA 1151	Q1 2017
Core i5	7640X	4	4	4.00	4.20	256KB	1MB	6MB	—N/a	—N/a	—N/a	112 W	Kaby Lake	LGA 2066	Q1 2017
Core i5	7600K	4	4	3.80	4.20	256KB	1MB	6MB	HD 630	350	1150	91 W	Kaby Lake	LGA 1151	Q1 2017
Core i5	7600	4	4	3.50	4.10	256KB	1MB	6MB	HD 630	350	1150	65 W	Kaby Lake	LGA 1151	Q1 2017
Core i5	7600T	4	4	2.80	3.70	256KB	1MB	6MB	HD 630	350	1100	35 W	Kaby Lake	LGA 1151	Q1 2017
Core i5	7500	4	4	3.40	3.80	256KB	1MB	6MB	HD 630	350	1100	65 W	Kaby Lake	LGA 1151	Q1 2017
Core i5	7500T	4	4	2.70	3.30	256KB	1MB	6MB	HD 630	350	1100	35 W	Kaby Lake	LGA 1151	Q1 2017
Core i5	7400	4	4	3.00	3.50	256KB	1MB	6MB	HD 630	350	1000	65 W	Kaby Lake	LGA 1151	Q1 2017
Core i5	7400T	4	4	2.40	3.00	256KB	1MB	6MB	HD 630	350	1000	35 W	Kaby Lake	LGA 1151	Q1 2017
Core i3	7350K	2	4	4.20	—N/a	128KB	512KB	4MB	HD 630	350	1150	60 W	Kaby Lake	LGA 1151	Q1 2017
Core i3	7320	2	4	4.10	—N/a	128KB	512KB	4MB	HD 630	350	1150	51 W	Kaby Lake	LGA 1151	Q1 2017
Core i3	7300	2	4	4.00	—N/a	128KB	512KB	4MB	HD 630	350	1150	51 W	Kaby Lake	LGA 1151	Q1 2017
Core i3	7300T	2	4	3.50	—N/a	128KB	512KB	4MB	HD 630	350	1100	35 W	Kaby Lake	LGA 1151	Q1 2017
Core i3	7100	2	4	3.90	—N/a	128KB	512KB	3MB	HD 630	350	1100	51 W	Kaby Lake	LGA 1151	Q1 2017
Core i3	7100T	2	4	3.40	—N/a	128KB	512KB	3MB	HD 630	350	1100	35 W	Kaby Lake	LGA 1151	Q1 2017
Core i3	7101E	2	4	3.90	—N/a	128KB	512KB	3MB	HD 630	350	1100	54 W	Kaby Lake	LGA 1151	Q1 2017
Core i3	7101TE	2	4	3.40	—N/a	128KB	512KB	3MB	HD 630	350	1100	35 W	Kaby Lake	LGA 1151	Q1 2017
Pentium	G4620	2	4	3.70	—N/a	128KB	512KB	3MB	HD 630	350	1100	51 W	Kaby Lake	LGA 1151	Q1 2017
Pentium	G4600	2	4	3.60	—N/a	128KB	512KB	3MB	HD 630	350	1100	51 W	Kaby Lake	LGA 1151	Q1 2017
Pentium	G4600T	2	4	3.00	—N/a	128KB	512KB	3MB	HD 630	350	1050	35 W	Kaby Lake	LGA 1151	Q1 2017
Pentium	G4560	2	4	3.50	—N/a	128KB	512KB	3MB	HD 610	350	1050	54 W	Kaby Lake	LGA 1151	Q1 2017
Pentium	G4560T	2	4	2.90	—N/a	128KB	512KB	3MB	HD 610	350	1050	35 W	Kaby Lake	LGA 1151	Q1 2017
Celeron	G3950	2	2	3.00	—N/a	128KB	512KB	2MB	HD 610	350	1050	51 W	Kaby Lake	LGA 1151	Q1 2017
Celeron	G3930	2	2	2.90	—N/a	128KB	512KB	2MB	HD 610	350	1050	51 W	Kaby Lake	LGA 1151	Q1 2017
Celeron	G3930T	2	2	2.70	—N/a	128KB	512KB	2MB	HD 610	350	1000	35 W	Kaby Lake	LGA 1151	Q1 2017

==== Mobile (codenamed "Kaby Lake" and "Apollo Lake") ====
Processor family	Model	Cores	Threads	Clock rate (GHz)		Cache			IGP			TDP	Codename	Socket	Release
Processor family	Model	Cores	Threads	Base	Max. turbo	L1	L2	L3	Processor	Clock rate (MHz)		TDP	Codename	Socket	Release
Processor family	Model	Cores	Threads	Base	Max. turbo	L1	L2	L3	Processor	Base	Max. dynamic	TDP	Codename	Socket	Release
Core i7	7920HQ	4	8	3.10	4.10	256KB	1MB	8MB	HD 630	350	1100	45 W	Kaby Lake	BGA 1440	Q1 2017
Core i7	7820HQ	4	8	2.90	3.90	256KB	1MB	8MB	HD 630	350	1100	45 W	Kaby Lake	BGA 1440	Q1 2017
Core i7	7820HK	4	8	2.90	3.90	256KB	1MB	8MB	HD 630	350	1100	45 W	Kaby Lake	BGA 1440	Q1 2017
Core i7	7700HQ	4	8	2.80	3.80	256KB	1MB	6MB	HD 630	350	1100	45 W	Kaby Lake	BGA 1440	Q1 2017
Core i7	7660U	2	4	2.50	4.00	128KB	512KB	4MB	Iris Plus 640	300	1100	15 W	Kaby Lake	BGA 1356	Q1 2017
Core i7	7600U	2	4	2.80	3.90	128KB	512KB	4MB	HD 620	300	1150	15 W	Kaby Lake	BGA 1356	Q3 2016
Core i7	7567U	2	4	3.50	4.00	128KB	512KB	4MB	Iris Plus 650	300	1150	28 W	Kaby Lake	BGA 1356	Q3 2016
Core i7	7560U	2	4	2.40	3.80	128KB	512KB	4MB	Iris Plus 640	300	1050	15 W	Kaby Lake	BGA 1356	Q1 2017
Core i7	7500U	2	4	2.70	3.50	128KB	512KB	4MB	HD 620	300	1050	15 W	Kaby Lake	BGA 1356	Q1 2017
Core i7	7Y75	2	4	1.30	3.60	128KB	512KB	4MB	HD 615	300	1050	4.5 W	Kaby Lake	BGA 1515	Q1 2017
Core i5	7440HQ	4	4	2.80	3.80	256KB	1MB	6MB	HD 630	350	1000	45 W	Kaby Lake	BGA 1440	Q1 2017
Core i5	7300HQ	4	4	2.50	3.50	256KB	1MB	6MB	HD 630	350	1000	45 W	Kaby Lake	BGA 1440	Q1 2017
Core i5	7360U	2	4	2.30	3.60	128KB	512KB	4MB	Iris Plus 640	300	1000	15 W	Kaby Lake	BGA 1356	Q1 2017
Core i5	7300U	2	4	2.60	3.50	128KB	512KB	3MB	HD 620	300	1100	15 W	Kaby Lake	BGA 1356	Q1 2017
Core i5	7287U	2	4	3.30	3.70	128KB	512KB	4MB	Iris Plus 650	300	1100	28 W	Kaby Lake	BGA 1356	Q1 2017
Core i5	7267U	2	4	3.10	3.50	128KB	512KB	4MB	Iris Plus 650	300	1050	28 W	Kaby Lake	BGA 1356	Q1 2017
Core i5	7260U	2	4	2.20	3.40	128KB	512KB	4MB	Iris Plus 640	300	950	15 W	Kaby Lake	BGA 1356	Q1 2017
Core i5	7200U	2	4	2.50	3.10	128KB	512KB	3MB	HD 620	300	1000	15 W	Kaby Lake	BGA 1356	Q3 2016
Core i5	7Y57	2	4	1.20	3.30	128KB	512KB	4MB	HD 615	300	950	4.5 W	Kaby Lake	BGA 1515	Q1 2017
Core i5	7Y54	2	4	1.20	3.20	128KB	512KB	4MB	HD 615	300	950	4.5 W	Kaby Lake	BGA 1515	Q1 2017
Core i3	7100H	2	4	3.00	—N/a	128KB	512KB	3MB	HD 630	350	950	35 W	Kaby Lake	BGA 1440	Q1 2017
Core i3	7167U	2	4	2.80	—N/a	128KB	512KB	3MB	Iris Plus 650	300	1000	28 W	Kaby Lake	BGA 1356	Q1 2017
Core i3	7130U	2	4	2.70	—N/a	128KB	512KB	3MB	HD 620	300	1000	15 W	Kaby Lake	BGA 1356	Q2 2017
Core i3	7100U	2	4	2.40	—N/a	128KB	512KB	3MB	HD 620	300	1000	15 W	Kaby Lake	BGA 1356	Q3 2016
Core m3	7Y32	2	4	1.10	3.00	128KB	512KB	4MB	HD 615	300	900	4.5 W	Kaby Lake	BGA 1515	Q2 2017
Core m3	7Y30	2	4	1.00	2.60	128KB	512KB	4MB	HD 615	300	900	4.5 W	Kaby Lake	BGA 1515	Q3 2016
Pentium	N4200	4	4	1.10	2.50	224KB	2MB	—N/a	HD 505	200	750	6 W	Kaby Lake	BGA 1296	Q3 2016
Pentium	4415U	2	4	2.30	—N/a	128KB	512KB	2MB	HD 610	300	950	15 W	Kaby Lake	BGA 1356	Q1 2017
Pentium	4415Y	2	4	1.60	—N/a	128KB	512KB	2MB	HD 615	300	850	6 W	Kaby Lake	BGA 1515	Q2 2017
Pentium	4410Y	2	4	1.50	—N/a	256KB	1MB	2MB	HD 615	300	850	6 W	Kaby Lake	BGA 1515	Q1 2017
Celeron	N3450	4	4	1.10	2.20	224KB	2MB	—N/a	HD 500	200	700	6 W	Apollo Lake	BGA 1296	Q3 2016
Celeron	N3350	2	2	1.10	2.40	112KB	2MB	—N/a	HD 500	200	650	6 W	Apollo Lake	BGA 1296	Q3 2016
Celeron	3965U	2	2	2.20	—N/a	128KB	512KB	2MB	HD 610	300	900	15 W	Kaby Lake	BGA 1356	Q1 2017
Celeron	3865U	2	2	1.80	—N/a	128KB	512KB	2MB	HD 610	300	900	15 W	Kaby Lake	BGA 1356	Q1 2017

=== Mainstream desktop processors ===
Common features of the mainstream desktop Skylake CPUs:

- DMI 3.0 and PCIe 3.0 interfaces
- Dual-channel memory support in the following configurations: DDR3L-1600 1.35 V (32 GB maximum) or DDR4-2133 1.2 V (64 GB maximum). DDR3 is unofficially supported through some motherboard vendors
- 16 PCIe 3.0 lanes
- The Core-branded processors support the AVX2 instruction set. The Celeron and Pentium-branded ones only support up to SSE4.2
- 350 MHz base graphics clock rate

Processor branding and model		Cores (threads)	Clock rate (GHz)				GPU			Cache				TDP	Socket	Release date	Release price (USD)
Processor branding and model		Cores (threads)	Base	Turbo Boost 2.0			Model	EUs	Max freq. (GHz)	L1	L2	L3	L4 (eDRAM)	TDP	Socket	Release date	Release price (USD)
Processor branding and model		Cores (threads)	Base	1	2	4	Model	EUs	Max freq. (GHz)	L1	L2	L3	L4 (eDRAM)	TDP	Socket	Release date	Release price (USD)
Core i7	6700K	4 (8)	4.0	4.2	4.0		HD 530	24	1.15	256KB	1MB	8MB	—N/a	91 W	LGA 1151	August 5, 2015	$339
Core i7	6785R	4 (8)	3.3	3.9	3.8	3.5	Iris Pro 580	72	1.15	256KB	1MB	8MB	128 MB	65 W	BGA 1440	May 3, 2016	$370
Core i7	6700	4 (8)	3.4	4.0	3.9	3.7	HD 530	24	1.15	256KB	1MB	8MB	—N/a	65 W	LGA 1151	September 1, 2015	$303
Core i7	6700T	4 (8)	2.8	3.6	3.5	3.4	HD 530	24	1.15	256KB	1MB	8MB	—N/a	35 W	LGA 1151	September 1, 2015	$303
Core i5	6600K	4 (4)	3.5	3.9	3.8	3.6	HD 530	24	1.15	256KB	1MB	6MB	—N/a	91 W	LGA 1151	August 5, 2015	$242
Core i5	6685R	4 (4)	3.2	3.8	3.7	3.3	Iris Pro 580	72	1.15	256KB	1MB	6MB	128 MB	65 W	BGA 1440	May 3, 2016	$288
Core i5	6600	4 (4)	3.3	3.9	3.8	3.6	HD 530	24	1.15	256KB	1MB	6MB	—N/a	65 W	LGA 1151	September 1, 2015	$213
Core i5	6585R	4 (4)	2.8	3.6	3.5	3.1	Iris Pro 580	72	1.1	256KB	1MB	6MB	128 MB	65 W	BGA 1440	May 3, 2016	$255
Core i5	6500	4 (4)	3.2	3.6	3.5	3.3	HD 530	24	1.05	256KB	1MB	6MB	—N/a	65 W	LGA 1151	September 1, 2015	$192
Core i5	6600T	4 (4)	2.7	3.5	3.4	3.3	HD 530	24	1.1	256KB	1MB	6MB	—N/a	35 W	LGA 1151	Q3 2015	$213
Core i5	6500T	4 (4)	2.5	3.1	3.0	2.8	HD 530	24	1.1	256KB	1MB	6MB	—N/a	35 W	LGA 1151	Q3 2015	$192
Core i5	6402P	4 (4)	2.8	3.4		3.2	HD 510	12	0.95	256KB	1MB	6MB	—N/a	65 W	LGA 1151	December 27, 2015	$182
Core i5	6400T	4 (4)	2.2	2.8	2.7	2.5	HD 530	24	0.95	256KB	1MB	6MB	—N/a	35 W	LGA 1151	Q3 2015	$182
Core i5	6400	4 (4)	2.7	3.3		3.1	HD 530	24	0.95	256KB	1MB	6MB	—N/a	65 W	LGA 1151	August 5, 2015	$182
Core i3	6320	2 (4)	3.9	—N/a			HD 530	24	1.15	128KB	512KB	4MB	—N/a	51 W	LGA 1151	Q3 2015	$149
Core i3	6300	2 (4)	3.8	—N/a			HD 530	24	1.15	128KB	512KB	4MB	—N/a	51 W	LGA 1151	Q3 2015	$138
Core i3	6100	2 (4)	3.7	—N/a			HD 530	24	1.05	128KB	512KB	3 MB	—N/a	51 W	LGA 1151	October 2015	$117
Core i3	6300T	2 (4)	3.3	—N/a			HD 530	24	0.95	128KB	512KB	4 MB	—N/a	35 W	LGA 1151	October 2015	$138
Core i3	6100T	2 (4)	3.2	—N/a			HD 530	24	0.95	128KB	512KB	3 MB	—N/a	35 W	LGA 1151	October 2015	$117
Core i3	6098P	2 (4)	3.6	—N/a			HD 510	12	1.050	128KB	512KB	3 MB	—N/a	54 W	LGA 1151	December 27, 2015	$117
Pentium	G4520	2 (2)	3.6	—N/a			HD 530	24	1.050	128KB	512KB	3 MB	—N/a	51 W	LGA 1151	October 2015	$86
Pentium	G4500	2 (2)	3.5	—N/a			HD 530	24	1.050	128KB	512KB	3 MB	—N/a	51 W	LGA 1151	October 2015	$75
Pentium	G4500T	2 (2)	3.0	—N/a			HD 530	24	0.95	128KB	512KB	3 MB	—N/a	35 W	LGA 1151	Q3 2015	$75
Pentium	G4400	2 (2)	3.3	—N/a			HD 510	12	1.0	128KB	512KB	3 MB	—N/a	54 W	LGA 1151	October 2015	$64
Pentium	G4400T	2 (2)	2.9	—N/a			HD 510	12	0.95	128KB	512KB	3 MB	—N/a	35 W	LGA 1151	Q3 2015	$64
Pentium	G4400TE	2 (2)	2.4	—N/a			HD 510	12	0.95	128KB	512KB	3 MB	—N/a	35 W	LGA 1151	Q4 2015	$70
Celeron	G3920	2 (2)	2.9	—N/a			HD 510	12	0.95	128KB	512KB	2 MB	—N/a	51 W	LGA 1151	Q4 2015	$52
Celeron	G3900	2 (2)	2.8	—N/a			HD 510	12	0.95	128KB	512KB	2 MB	—N/a	51 W	LGA 1151	Q4 2015	$42
Celeron	G3900TE	2 (2)	2.3	—N/a			HD 510	12	0.95	128KB	512KB	2 MB	—N/a	35 W	LGA 1151	Q4 2015	$42
Celeron	G3900T	2 (2)	2.6	—N/a			HD 510	12	0.95	128KB	512KB	2 MB	—N/a	35 W	LGA 1151	Q4 2015	$42

=== Mobile processors ===
For mobile workstation processors, see Server processors.

Processor branding and model		Cores (threads)	CPU clock rate	CPU Turbo clock rate			GPU	GPU clock rate		Cache				TDP	cTDP		Release date	Price (USD)
Processor branding and model		Cores (threads)	CPU clock rate	Single core	Dual core	Quad core	GPU	Base	Turbo	L1	L2	L3	L4 (eDRAM)	TDP	Up	Down	Release date	Price (USD)
Core i7	6970HQ	4 (8)	2.8 GHz	3.7 GHz	?		Iris Pro 580	350 MHz	1050 MHz	256KB	1MB	8MB	128MB	45 W	—N/a	35 W	Q1 2016	$623
Core i7	6920HQ	4 (8)	2.9 GHz	3.8 GHz	3.6 GHz	3.4 GHz	HD 530	350 MHz	1050 MHz	256KB	1MB	8MB	—N/a	45 W	—N/a	35 W	September 1, 2015	$568
Core i7	6870HQ	4 (8)	2.7 GHz	3.6 GHz	?		Iris Pro 580	350 MHz	1000 MHz	256KB	1MB	8MB	128MB	45 W	—N/a	35 W	Q1 2016	$434
Core i7	6820HQ	4 (8)	2.7 GHz	3.6 GHz	3.4 GHz	3.2 GHz	HD 530	350 MHz	1050 MHz	256KB	1MB	8MB	—N/a	45 W	—N/a	35 W	September 1, 2015	$378
Core i7	6820HK	4 (8)	2.7 GHz	3.6 GHz	3.4 GHz	3.2 GHz	HD 530	350 MHz	1050 MHz	256KB	1MB	8MB	—N/a	45 W	—N/a	35 W	September 1, 2015	$378
Core i7	6770HQ	4 (8)	2.6 GHz	3.5 GHz	?		Iris Pro 580	350 MHz	950 MHz	256KB	1MB	6MB	128MB	45 W	—N/a	35 W	Q1 2016	$434
Core i7	6700HQ	4 (8)	2.6 GHz	3.5 GHz	3.3 GHz	3.1 GHz	HD 530	350 MHz	1050 MHz	256KB	1MB	6MB	—N/a	45 W	—N/a	35 W	September 1, 2015	$378
Core i7	6660U	2 (4)	2.4 GHz	3.4 GHz	3.2 GHz	—N/a	Iris 540	300 MHz	1050 MHz	128KB	512KB	4MB	64MB	15 W	—N/a	9.5 W	Q1 2016	$415
Core i7	6650U	2 (4)	2.2 GHz	3.4 GHz	3.2 GHz	—N/a	Iris 540	300 MHz	1050 MHz	128KB	512KB	4MB	64MB	15 W	—N/a	9.5 W	Q3 2015	$415
Core i7	6600U	2 (4)	2.6 GHz	3.4 GHz	—N/a	—N/a	HD 520	300 MHz	1050 MHz	128KB	512KB	4MB	—N/a	15 W	25 W	7.5 W	September 1, 2015	$393
Core i7	6567U	2 (4)	3.3 GHz	3.6 GHz	3.4 GHz	—N/a	Iris 550	300 MHz	1100 MHz	128KB	512KB	4MB	64MB	28 W	—N/a	23 W	Q3 2015	TBD
Core i7	6560U	2 (4)	2.2 GHz	3.2 GHz	3.1 GHz	—N/a	Iris 540	300 MHz	1050 MHz	128KB	512KB	4MB	64MB	15 W	—N/a	9.5 W	Q3 2015	TBD
Core i7	6500U	2 (4)	2.5 GHz	3.1 GHz	3.0 GHz	—N/a	HD 520	300 MHz	1050 MHz	128KB	512KB	4MB	—N/a	15 W	—N/a	7.5 W	September 1, 2015	$393
Core i5	6440HQ	4 (4)	2.6 GHz	3.5 GHz	3.3 GHz	3.1 GHz	HD 530	350 MHz	950 MHz	256KB	1MB	6MB	—N/a	45 W	—N/a	35 W	September 1, 2015	$250
Core i5	6360U	2 (4)	2.0 GHz	3.1 GHz	2.9 GHz	—N/a	Iris 540	300 MHz	1000 MHz	128KB	512KB	4MB	64MB	15 W	—N/a	9.5 W	Q3 2015	$304
Core i5	6350HQ	4 (4)	2.3 GHz	3.2 GHz	?		Iris Pro 580	350 MHz	900 MHz	256KB	1MB	6MB	128MB	45 W	—N/a	35 W	Q1 2016	$306
Core i5	6300HQ	4 (4)	2.3 GHz	3.2 GHz	3.0 GHz	2.8 GHz	HD 530	350 MHz	950 MHz	256KB	1MB	6MB	—N/a	45 W	—N/a	35 W	September 1, 2015	$250
Core i5	6300U	2 (4)	2.4 GHz	3.0 GHz	2.9 GHz	—N/a	HD 520	300 MHz	1000 MHz	128KB	512KB	3MB	—N/a	15 W	—N/a	7.5 W	September 1, 2015	$281
Core i5	6287U	2 (4)	3.1 GHz	3.5 GHz	3.3 GHz	—N/a	Iris 550	300 MHz	1100 MHz	128KB	512KB	4MB	64MB	28 W	—N/a	23 W	Q3 2015	$304
Core i5	6267U	2 (4)	2.9 GHz	3.3 GHz	3.1 GHz	—N/a	Iris 550	300 MHz	1050 MHz	128KB	512KB	4MB	64MB	28 W	—N/a	23 W	Q3 2015	$304
Core i5	6260U	2 (4)	1.8 GHz	2.9 GHz	2.7 GHz	—N/a	Iris 540	300 MHz	950 MHz	128KB	512KB	4MB	64MB	15 W	—N/a	9.5 W	Q3 2015	$304
Core i5	6200U	2 (4)	2.3 GHz	2.8 GHz	2.7 GHz	—N/a	HD 520	300 MHz	1000 MHz	128KB	512KB	3MB	—N/a	15 W	—N/a	7.5 W	September 1, 2015	$281
Core i3	6167U	2 (4)	2.7 GHz	—N/a	—N/a	—N/a	Iris 550	300 MHz	1000 MHz	128KB	512KB	3MB	64MB	28 W	—N/a	23 W	Q3 2015	$304
Core i3	6157U	2 (4)	2.4 GHz	—N/a	—N/a	—N/a	Iris 550	300 MHz	1000 MHz	128KB	512KB	3MB	64MB	28 W	—N/a	23 W	Q3 2016	$304
Core i3	6100H	2 (4)	2.7 GHz	—N/a	—N/a	—N/a	HD 530	350 MHz	900 MHz	128KB	512KB	3MB	—N/a	35 W	—N/a	—N/a	September 1, 2015	$225
Core i3	6100U	2 (4)	2.3 GHz	—N/a	—N/a	—N/a	HD 520	300 MHz	1000 MHz	128KB	512KB	3MB	—N/a	15 W	—N/a	7.5 W	September 1, 2015	$281
Core i3	6006U	2 (4)	2.0 GHz	—N/a	—N/a	—N/a	HD 520	300 MHz	900 MHz	128KB	512KB	3MB	—N/a	15 W	—N/a	—N/a	November, 2016	$281
Core m7	6Y75	2 (4)	1.2 GHz	3.1 GHz	2.9 GHz	—N/a	HD 515	300 MHz	1000 MHz	128KB	512KB	4MB	—N/a	4.5 W	7 W	3.5 W	September 1, 2015	$393
Core m5	6Y57	2 (4)	1.1 GHz	2.8 GHz	2.4 GHz	—N/a	HD 515	300 MHz	900 MHz	128KB	512KB	4MB	—N/a	4.5 W	7 W	3.5 W	September 1, 2015	$281
Core m5	6Y54	2 (4)	1.1 GHz	2.7 GHz	2.4 GHz	—N/a	HD 515	300 MHz	900 MHz	128KB	512KB	4MB	—N/a	4.5 W	7 W	3.5 W	September 1, 2015	$281
Core m3	6Y30	2 (4)	0.9 GHz	2.2 GHz	2.0 GHz	—N/a	HD 515	300 MHz	850 MHz	128KB	512KB	4MB	—N/a	4.5 W	7 W	3.8 W	September 1, 2015	$281
Pentium	4405U	2 (4)	2.1 GHz	—N/a	—N/a	—N/a	HD 510	300 MHz	950 MHz	128KB	512KB	2MB	—N/a	15 W	—N/a	10 W	Q3 2015	$161
Pentium	4405Y	2 (4)	1.5 GHz	—N/a	—N/a	—N/a	HD 515	300 MHz	800 MHz	128KB	512KB	2MB	—N/a	6 W	—N/a	4.5 W	Q3 2015	$161
Celeron	G3902E	2 (2)	1.6 GHz	—N/a			HD 510	350 MHz	950 MHz	128KB	512KB	2MB	—N/a	25 W	—N/a	—N/a	Q1 2016	$107
Celeron	G3900E	2 (2)	2.4 GHz	—N/a			HD 510	350 MHz	950 MHz	128KB	512KB	2MB	—N/a	35 W	—N/a	—N/a	Q1 2016	$107
Celeron	3955U	2 (2)	2.0 GHz	—N/a			HD 510	300 MHz	900 MHz	128KB	512KB	2MB	—N/a	15 W	—N/a	10 W	Q4 2015	$107
Celeron	3855U	2 (2)	1.6 GHz	—N/a			HD 510	300 MHz	900 MHz	128KB	512KB	2MB	—N/a	15 W	—N/a	10 W	Q4 2015	$107

== All processors ==
All processors are listed in chronological order.

=== The 4-bit processors ===
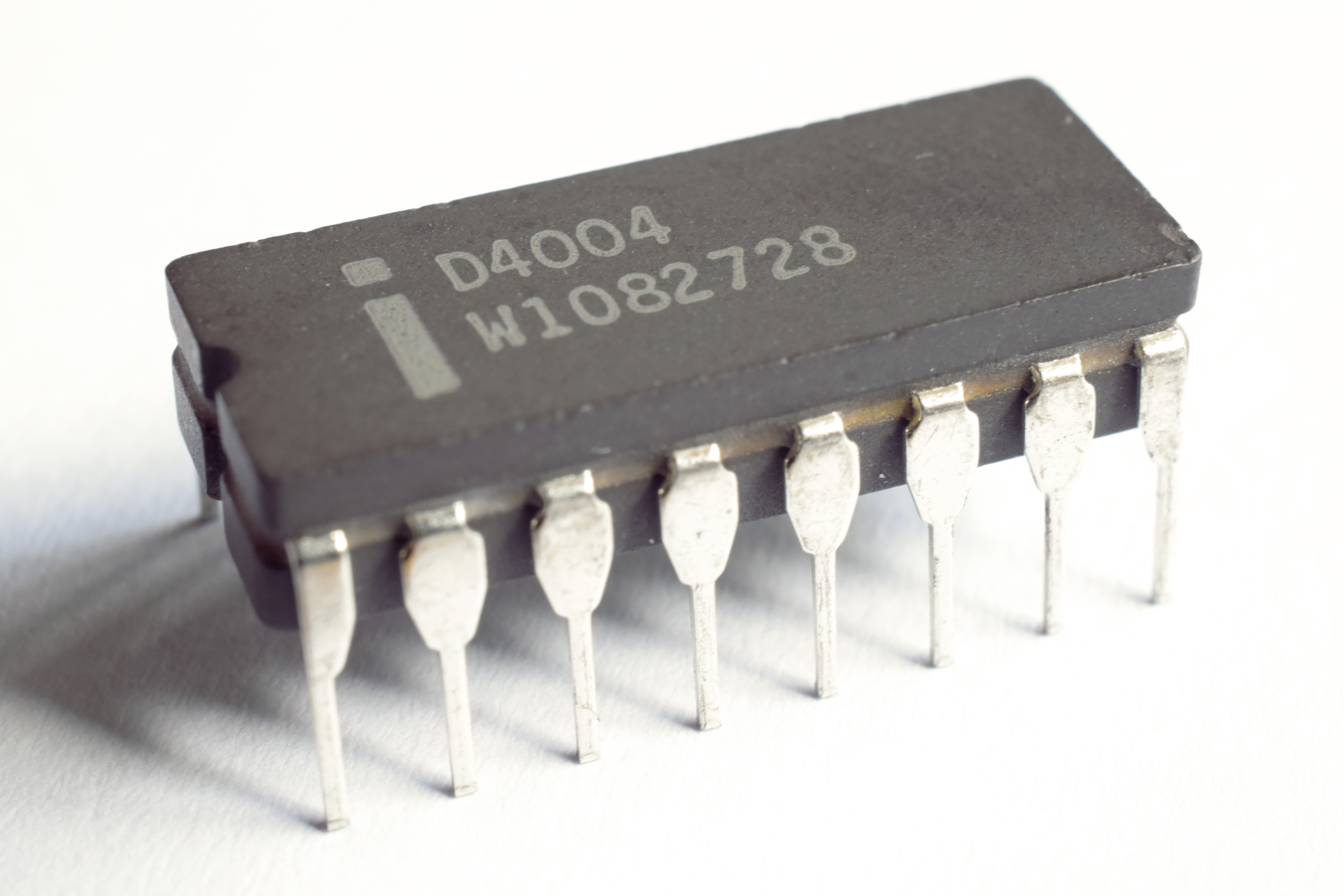
Intel D4004 (ceramic variant)

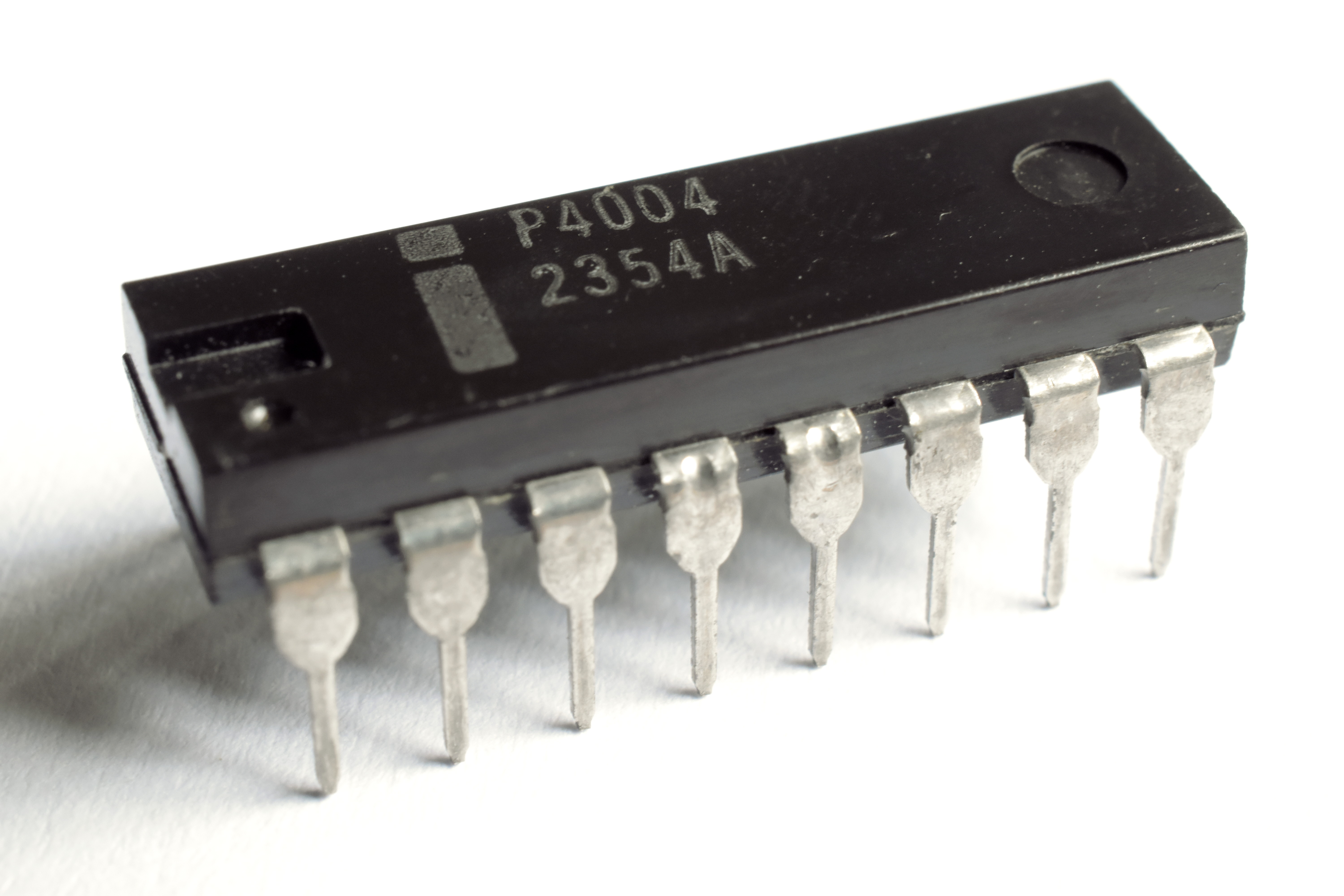
Intel P4004 (plastic variant)

==== Intel 4004 ====
First commercially available microprocessor (single-chip IC processor)

- Introduced November 15, 1971
- Clock rate 740 kHz (Note: The 4004's original goal was to equal the clock rate of the IBM 1620 Model I (1 MHz); this was not quite met.)
- 0.07 MIPS
- Bus width: 4 bits (five-way multiplexed address/data due to limited pins)
- PMOS
- 2,300 transistors at 10 μm
- Addressable memory 640 bytes
- Program memory 4 KB (4096 B)
- Originally designed to be used in Busicom calculator

MCS-4 family:

- 4004 – CPU
- 4001 – 256 byte ROM & 4-bit Port
- 4002 – 320 bit RAM & 4-bit Port
- 4003 – 10-bit Shift Register
- 4008 – Memory+I/O Interface
- 4009 – Memory+I/O Interface
- 4211 – General Purpose Byte I/O Port
- 4265 – Programmable General Purpose I/O Device
- 4269 – Programmable Keyboard Display Device
- 4289 – Standard Memory Interface for MCS-4/40
- 4801 – 5.185 MHz Clock Generator Crystal for 4004/4201A or 4040/4201A

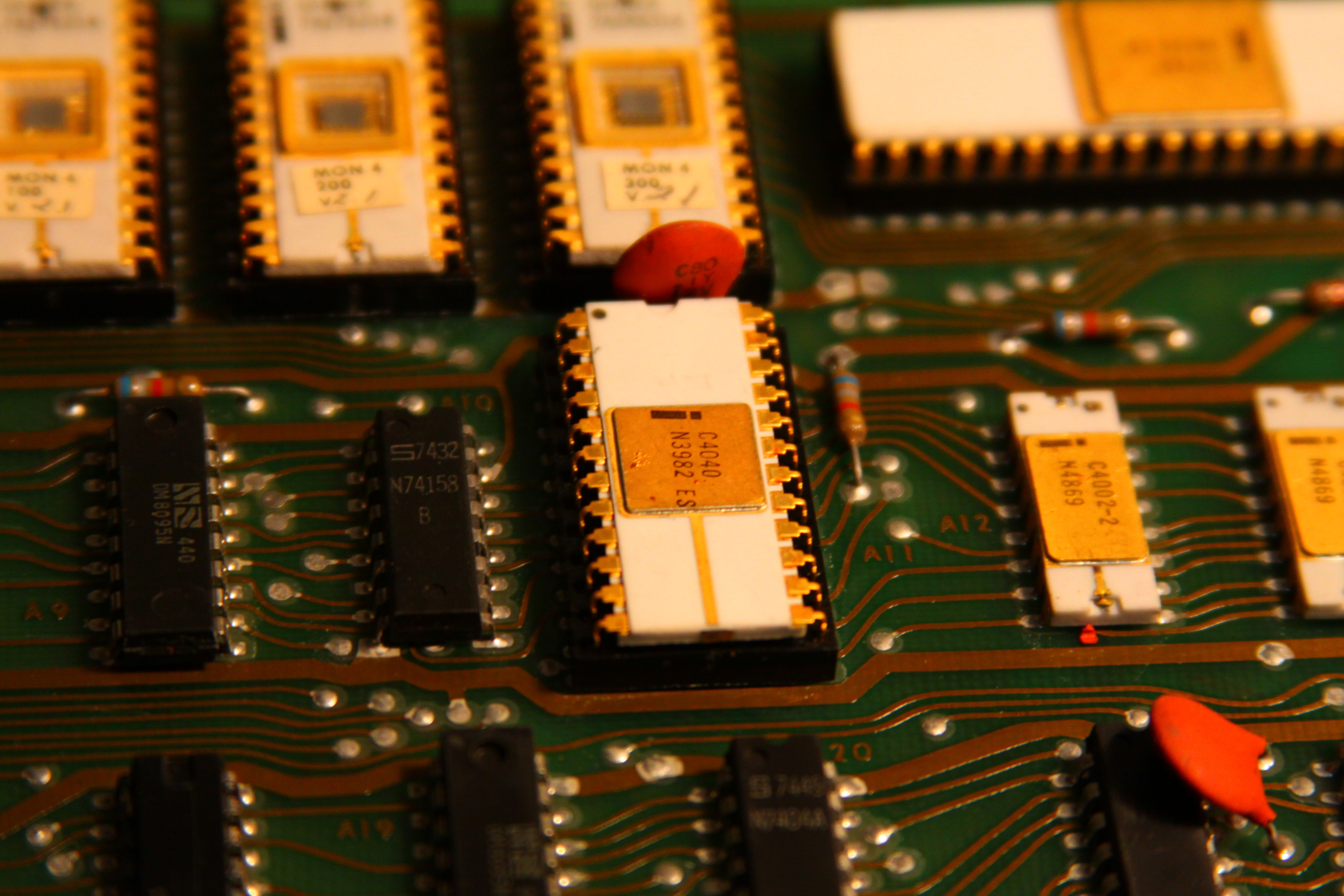
Intel C4040

==== Intel 4040 ====
- Introduced in 1974 by Intel
- Clock speed was 740 kHz (same as the 4004 microprocessor)
- 3,000 transistors
- Interrupt features were available
- Programmable memory size: 8 KB (8192 B)
- 640 bytes of data memory
- 24-pin DIP

=== The 8-bit processors ===
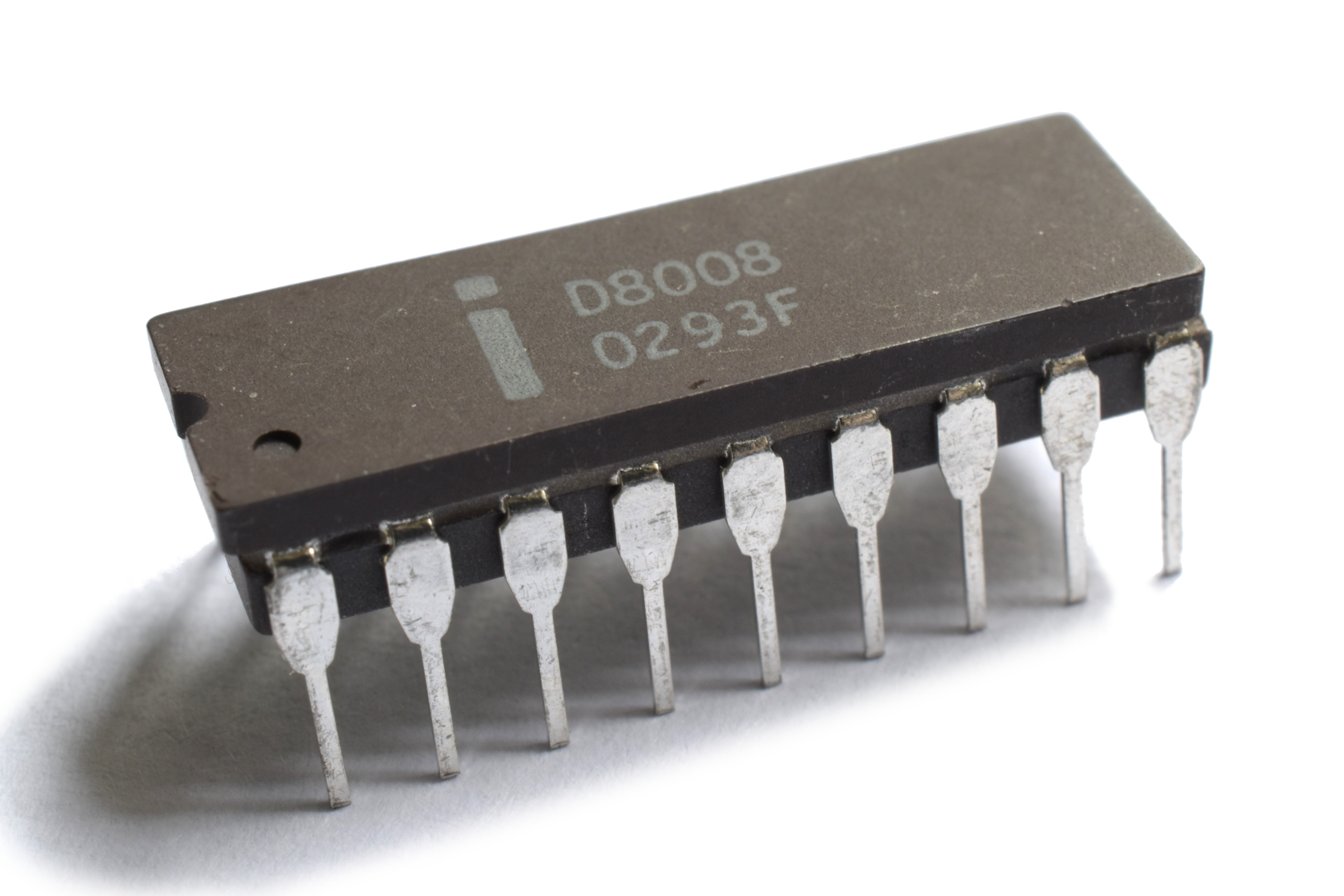
Intel D8008

==== 8008 ====
- Introduced April 1, 1972
- Clock rate 500 kHz (8008-1: 800 kHz)
- 0.05 MIPS
- Bus width: 8 bits (triple-multiplexed address/data due to limited pins)
- Enhancement load PMOS logic
- 3,500 transistors at 10 μm
- Addressable memory 16 KB
- Typical in early 8-bit microcomputers, dumb terminals, general calculators, bottling machines
- Developed in tandem with 4004
- Originally intended for use in the Datapoint 2200 microcomputer
- Key volume deployment in Texas Instruments 742 microcomputer in >3,000 Ford dealerships

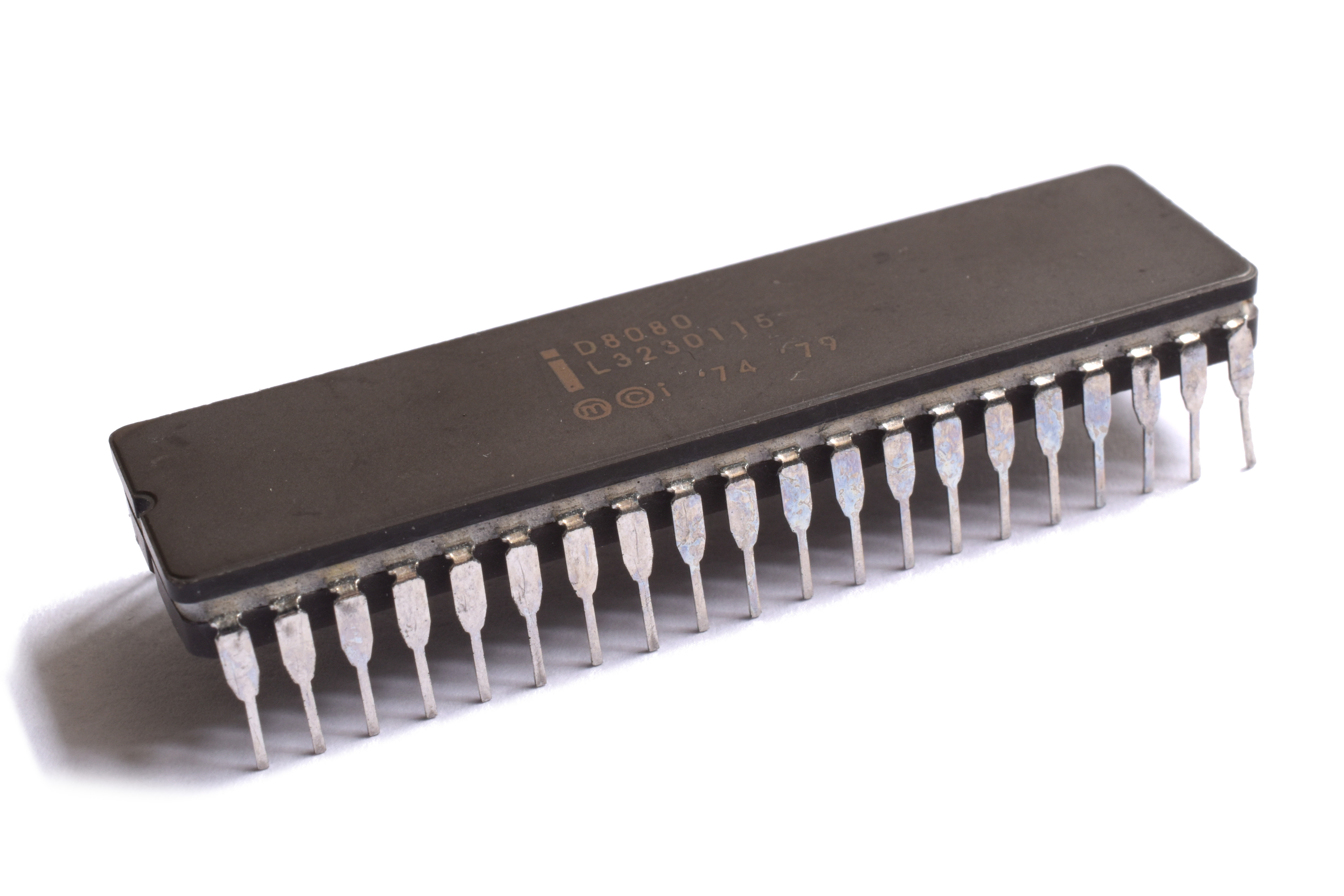
Intel D8080

==== 8080 ====
- Introduced April 1, 1974
- Clock rate 2 MHz (very rare 8080B: 3 MHz)
- 0.29 MIPS
- Data bus width: 8 bits, address bus: 16 bits
- Enhancement load NMOS logic
- 4,500 transistors at 6 μm
- Assembly language downward compatible with 8008
- Addressable memory 64 KB (64 × 1024 B)
- Up to 10× the performance of the 8008
- Used in the Altair 8800, traffic light controller, cruise missile
- Required two support chips versus 20 for the 8008

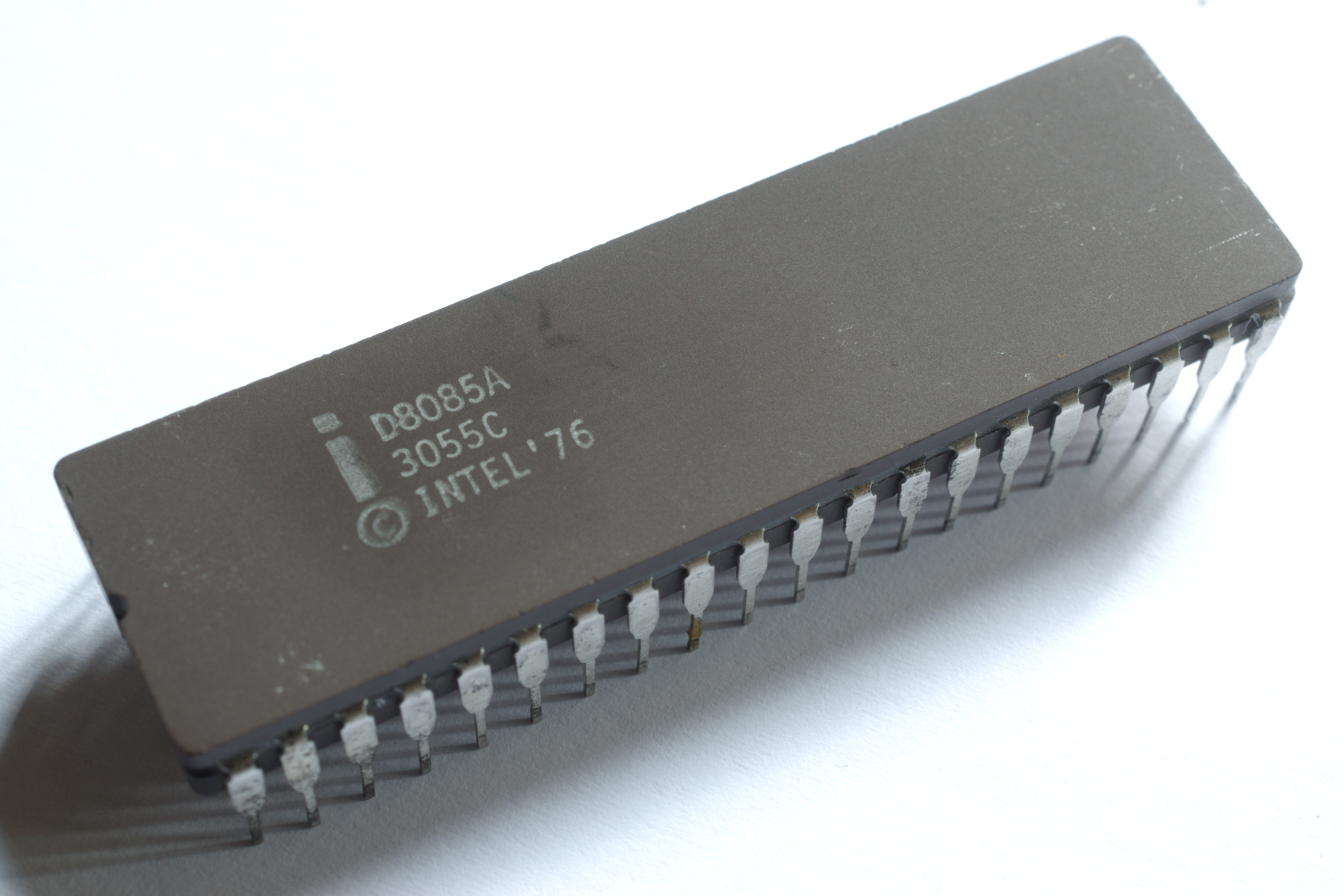
Intel D8085A

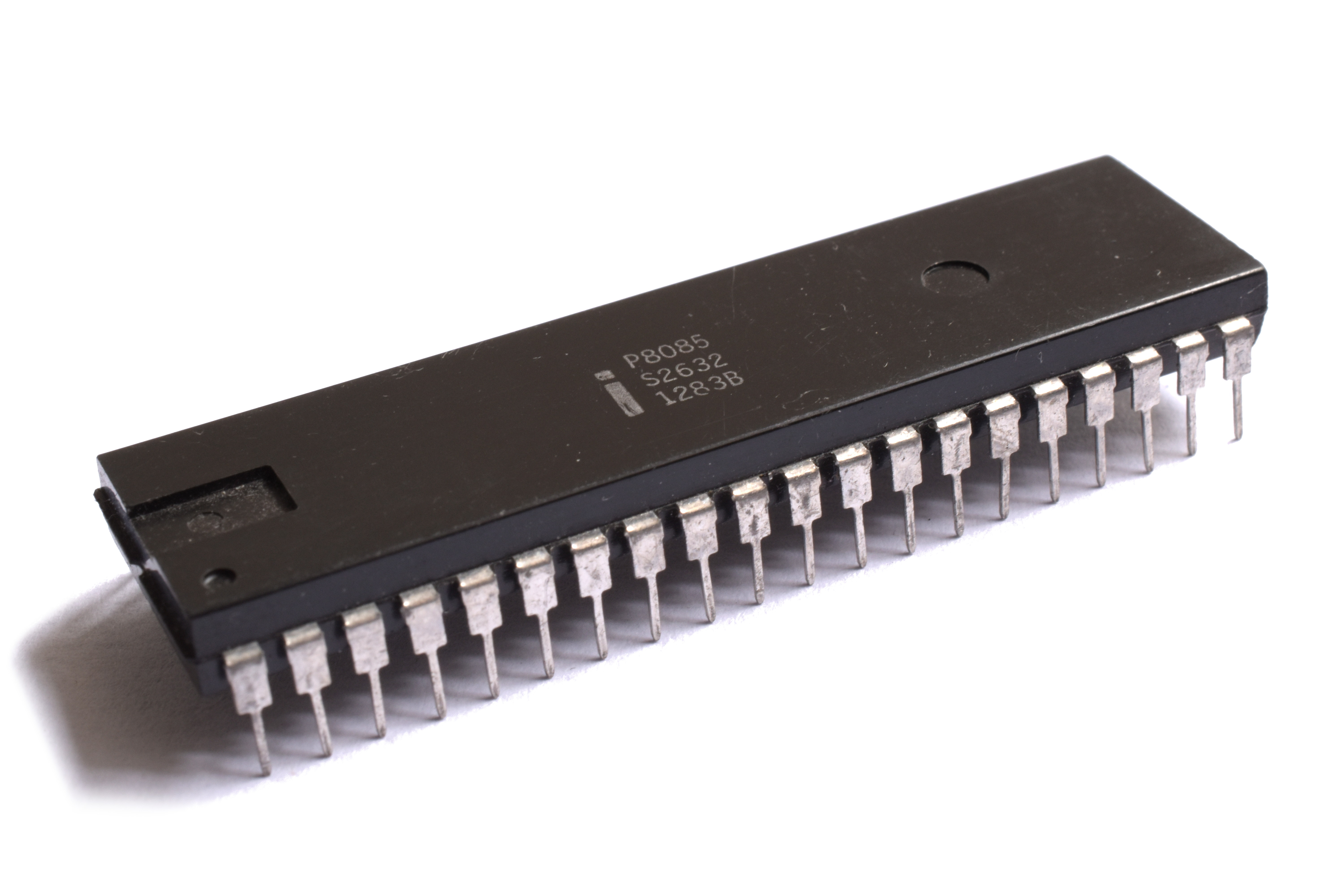
Intel P8085 (plastic variant)

==== 8085 ====
- Introduced March 1976
- Clock rate 3 MHz
- 0.37 MIPS
- Data bus width: 8 bits, address bus: 16 bits, multiplexed
- Depletion load NMOS logic
- 6,500 transistors at 3 μm
- Downward binary compatible with the 8080
- Used in Toledo scales. Also used as a computer peripheral controller – modems, hard disks, printers, etc.
- CMOS 80C85 in Mars Sojourner, Radio Shack Model 100 portable

=== Microcontrollers ===
They are ICs with CPU, RAM, ROM (or PROM or EPROM), I/O Ports, Timers & Interrupts

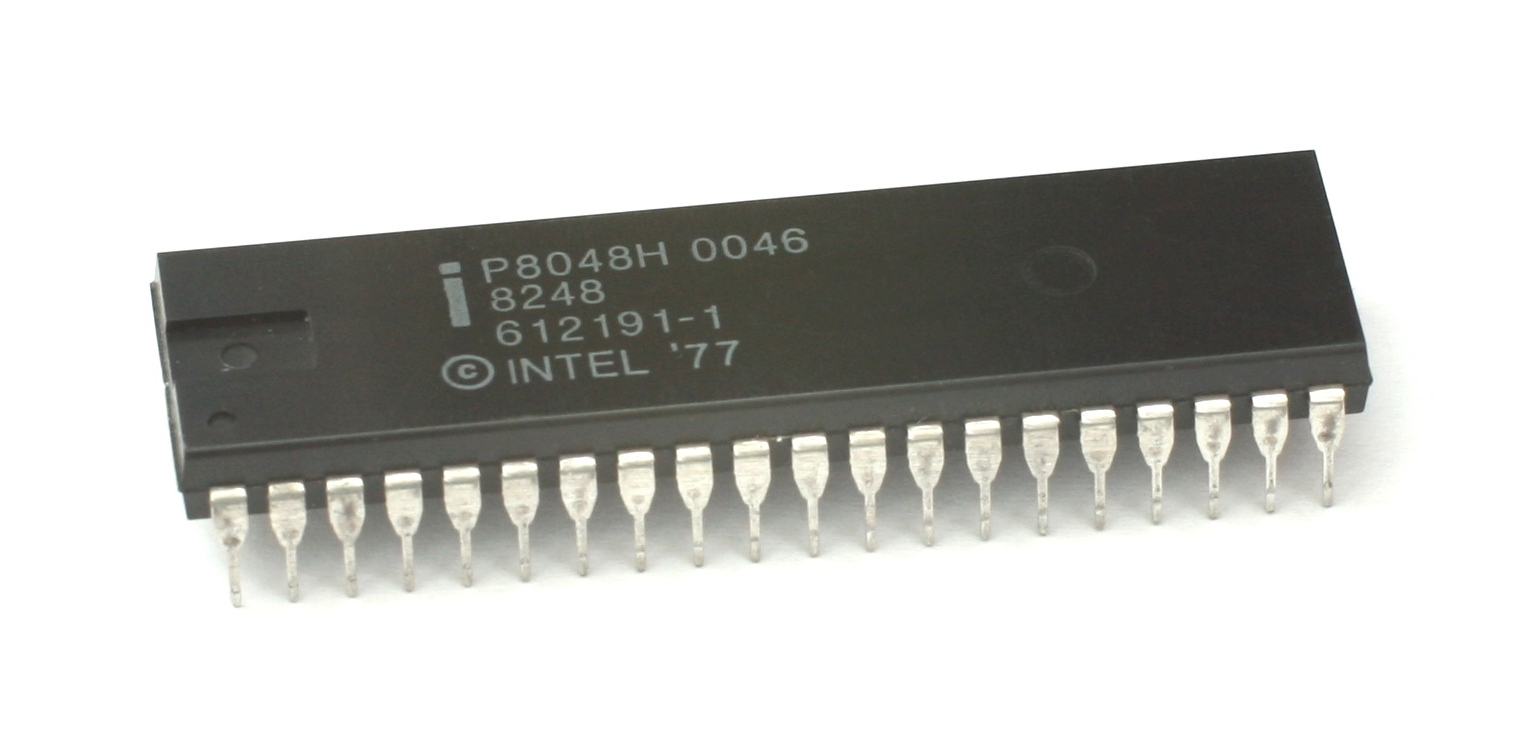
Intel P8048H

==== Intel 8048 ====
- Single accumulator Harvard architecture

MCS-48 family:

- 8020 – Single-Component 8-bit Microcontroller, 1 KB ROM, 64 Byte RAM, 13 I/O ports
- 8021 – Single-Component 8-bit Microcontroller, 1 KB ROM, 64 Byte RAM, 21 I/O ports
- 8022 – Single-Component 8-bit Microcontroller, 2 KB ROM, 64 Byte RAM with on-chip A/D Converter
- 8035 – 8-bit Microcontroller, 64 Byte RAM
- 8039 – 8-bit Microcontroller, 128 Byte RAM
- 8040 – 8-bit Microcontroller, 256 Byte RAM
- 8048 – Single-Component 8-bit Microcontroller, 1 KB ROM, 64 byte RAM, 27 I/O ports, 0.73 MIPS @ 11 MHz
- 8049 – Single-Component 8-bit Microcontroller, 2 KB ROM, 128 byte RAM, 27 I/O ports,
- 8050 – Single-Component 8-bit Microcontroller, 4 KB ROM, 256 byte RAM, 27 I/O ports,
- 8748 – Single-Component 8-bit Microcontroller, 1 KB EPROM, 64 byte RAM, 27 I/O ports,
- 8749 – Single-Component 8-bit Microcontroller, 2 KB EPROM, 128 byte RAM, 27 I/O ports,
- 87P50 – 8-bit Microcontroller, ext. ROM socket (2758/2716/2732), 256 byte RAM, 27 I/O ports
- 8648 – Single-Component 8-bit Microcontroller, 1 KB OTP EPROM, 64 byte RAM, 27 I/O ports
- 8041 – Universal Peripheral Interface 8-bit Slave Microcontroller, 1 KB ROM, 64 byte RAM
- 8041AH – Universal Peripheral Interface 8-bit Slave Microcontroller, 1 KB ROM, 128 byte RAM
- 8641 – Universal Peripheral Interface 8-bit Slave Microcontroller ?
- 8741 – Universal Peripheral Interface 8-bit Slave Microcontroller, 1 KB EPROM, 64 byte RAM
- 8741AH – Universal Peripheral Interface 8-bit Slave Microcontroller, 1 KB EPROM, 128 byte RAM
- 8042 – Universal Peripheral Interface 8-bit Slave Microcontroller, 2 KB ROM, 256 byte RAM
- 8742 – Universal Peripheral Interface 8-bit Slave Microcontroller, 2 KB EPROM, 128 byte RAM
- 8742AH – Universal Peripheral Interface 8-bit Slave Microcontroller, 2 KB OTP EPROM, 256 byte RAM

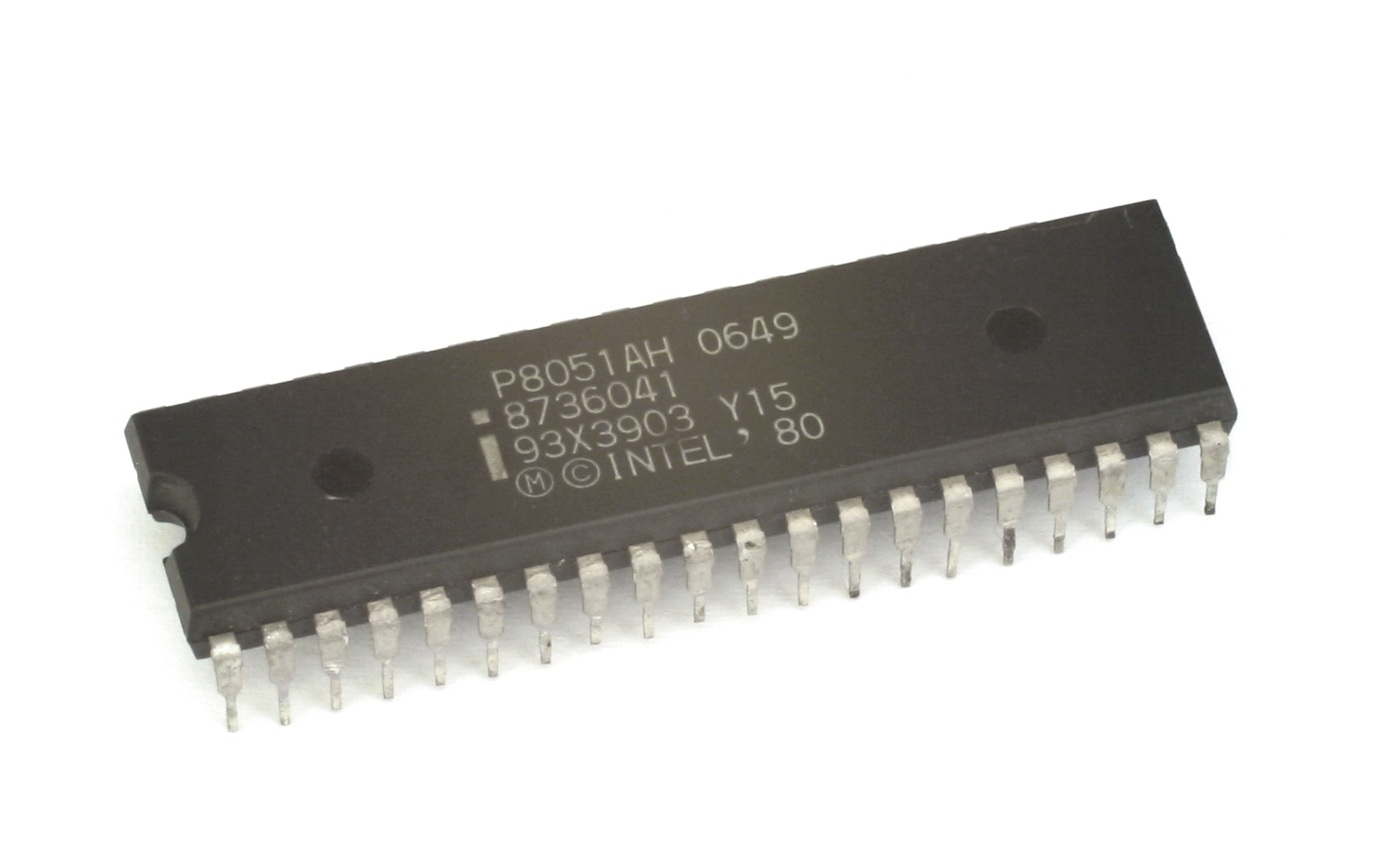
Intel P8051

==== Intel 8051 ====
- Single accumulator Harvard architecture

MCS-51 family:

- 8031 – 8-bit Control-Oriented Microcontroller
- 8032 – 8-bit Control-Oriented Microcontroller
- 8044 – High Performance 8-bit Microcontroller
- 8344 – High Performance 8-bit Microcontroller
- 8744 – High Performance 8-bit Microcontroller
- 8051 – 8-bit Control-Oriented Microcontroller
- 8052 – 8-bit Control-Oriented Microcontroller
- 8054 – 8-bit Control-Oriented Microcontroller
- 8058 – 8-bit Control-Oriented Microcontroller
- 8351 – 8-bit Control-Oriented Microcontroller
- 8352 – 8-bit Control-Oriented Microcontroller
- 8354 – 8-bit Control-Oriented Microcontroller
- 8358 – 8-bit Control-Oriented Microcontroller
- 8751 – 8-bit Control-Oriented Microcontroller
- 8752 – 8-bit Control-Oriented Microcontroller
- 8754 – 8-bit Control-Oriented Microcontroller
- 8758 – 8-bit Control-Oriented Microcontroller

==== Intel 80151 ====
- Single accumulator Harvard architecture

MCS-151 family:

- 80151 – High Performance 8-bit Control-Oriented Microcontroller
- 83151 – High Performance 8-bit Control-Oriented Microcontroller
- 87151 – High Performance 8-bit Control-Oriented Microcontroller
- 80152 – High Performance 8-bit Control-Oriented Microcontroller
- 83152 – High Performance 8-bit Control-Oriented Microcontroller

==== Intel 80251 ====
- Single accumulator Harvard architecture

MCS-251 family:

- 80251 – 8/16/32-bit Microcontroller
- 80252 – 8/16/32-bit Microcontroller
- 80452 – 8/16/32-bit Microcontroller
- 83251 – 8/16/32-bit Microcontroller
- 87251 – 8/16/32-bit Microcontroller
- 87253 – 8/16/32-bit Microcontroller

==== MCS-96 family ====
- 8061 – 16-bit Microcontroller (parent of MCS-96 family ROMless With A/D, most sold to Ford)
- 8094 – 16-bit Microcontroller (48-Pin ROMLess Without A/D)
- 8095 – 16-bit Microcontroller (48-Pin ROMLess With A/D)
- 8096 – 16-bit Microcontroller (68-Pin ROMLess Without A/D)
- 8097 – 16-bit Microcontroller (68-Pin ROMLess With A/D)
- 8394 – 16-bit Microcontroller (48-Pin With ROM Without A/D)
- 8395 – 16-bit Microcontroller (48-Pin With ROM With A/D)
- 8396 – 16-bit Microcontroller (68-Pin With ROM Without A/D)
- 8397 – 16-bit Microcontroller (68-Pin With ROM With A/D)
- 8794 – 16-bit Microcontroller (48-Pin With EROM Without A/D)
- 8795 – 16-bit Microcontroller (48-Pin With EROM With A/D)
- 8796 – 16-bit Microcontroller (68-Pin With EROM Without A/D)
- 8797 – 16-bit Microcontroller (68-Pin With EROM With A/D)
- 8098 – 16-bit Microcontroller
- 8398 – 16-bit Microcontroller
- 8798 – 16-bit Microcontroller
- 80196 – 16-bit Microcontroller
- 83196 – 16-bit Microcontroller
- 87196 – 16-bit Microcontroller
- 80296 – 16-bit Microcontroller

=== The bit-slice processor ===
==== 3000 family ====
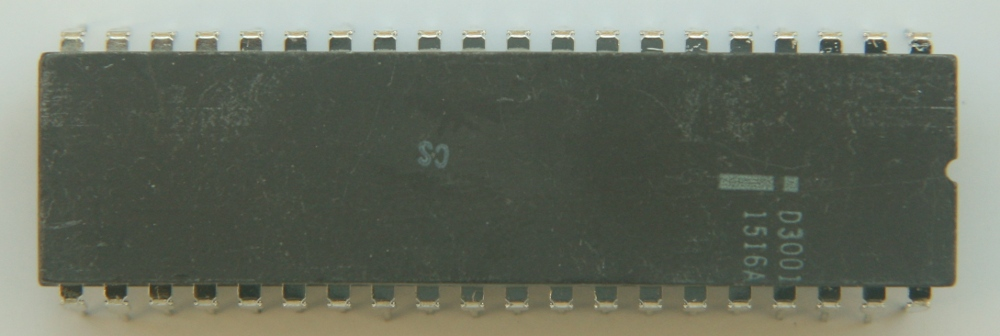
Intel D3001

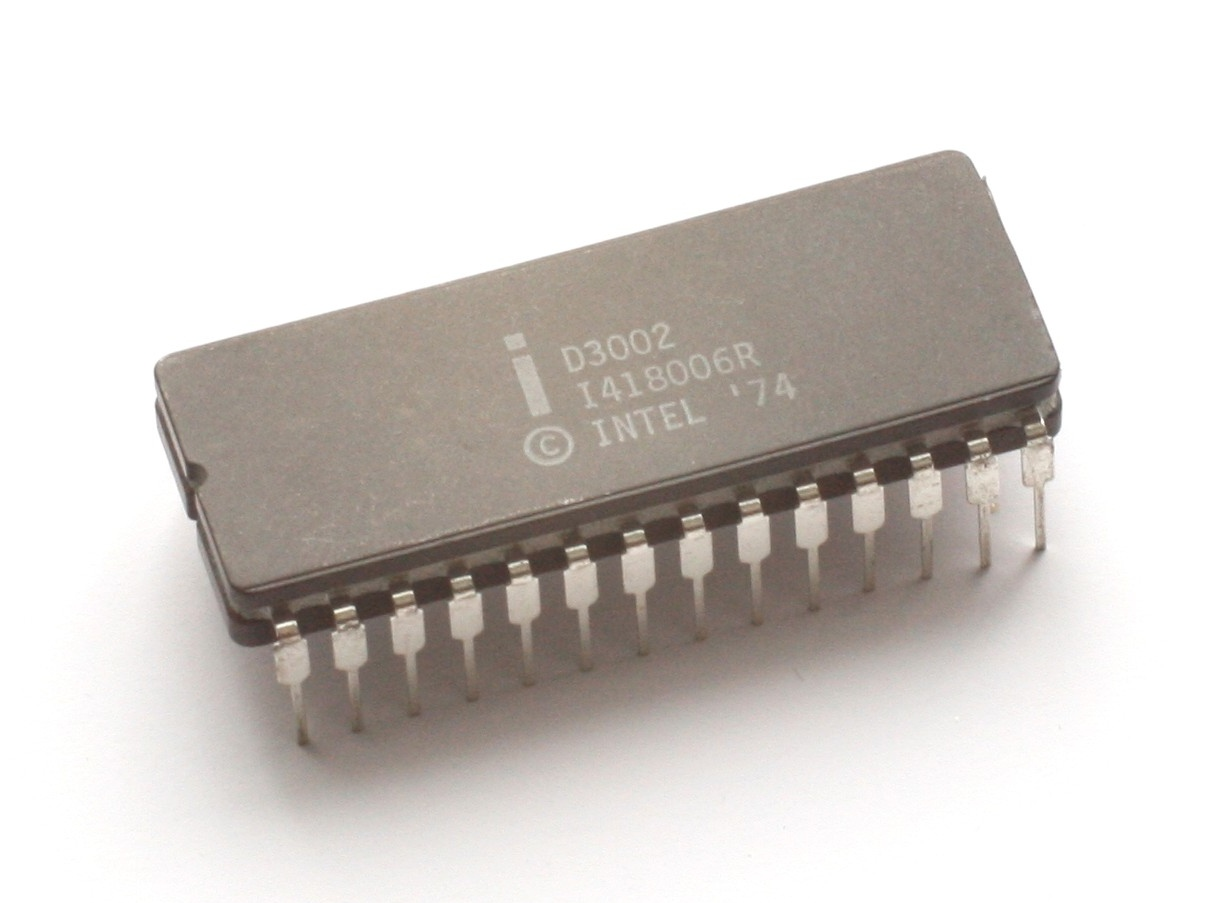
Intel D3002

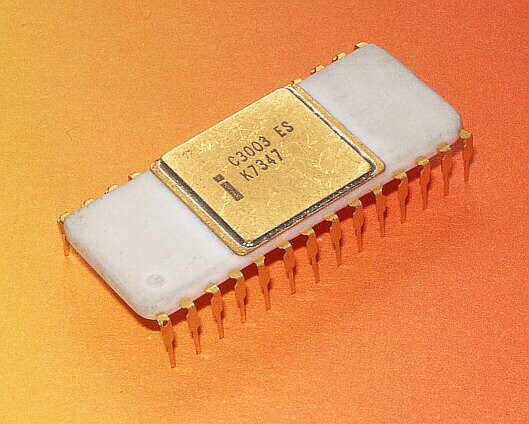
Intel C3003

Introduced in the third quarter of 1974, these bit-slicing components used bipolar Schottky transistors. Each component implemented two bits of a processor function; packages could be interconnected to build a processor with any desired word length.

Members of the 3000 family:

- 3001 – Microcontrol Unit
- 3002 – 2-bit Arithmetic Logic Unit slice
- 3003 – Look-ahead Carry Generator
- 3205 – High-performance 1 of 8 Binary Decoder
- 3207 – Quad Bipolar-to-MOS Level Shifter and Driver
- 3208 – Hex Sense Amp and Latch for MOS Memories
- 3210 – TTL-to-MOS Level Shifter and High Voltage Clock Driver
- 3211 – ECL-to-MOS Level Shifter and High Voltage Clock Driver
- 3212 – Multimode Latch Buffer
- 3214 – Interrupt Control Unit
- 3216 – Parallel, Inverting Bi-Directional Bus Driver
- 3222 – Refresh Controller for 4K (4096 B) NMOS DRAMs
- 3226 – Parallel, Inverting Bi-Directional Bus Driver
- 3232 – Address Multiplexer and Refresh Counter for 4K DRAMs
- 3242 – Address Multiplexer and Refresh Counter for 16K (16 × 1024 B) DRAMs
- 3245 – Quad Bipolar TTL-to-MOS Level Shifter and Driver for 4K
- 3246 – Quad Bipolar ECL-to-MOS Level Shifter and Driver for 4K
- 3404 – High-performance 6-bit Latch
- 3408 – Hex Sense Amp and Latch for MOS Memories
- 3505 – Next generation processor

Bus width 2n bits data/address (depending on number n of slices used)

=== The 16-bit processors: MCS-86 family ===
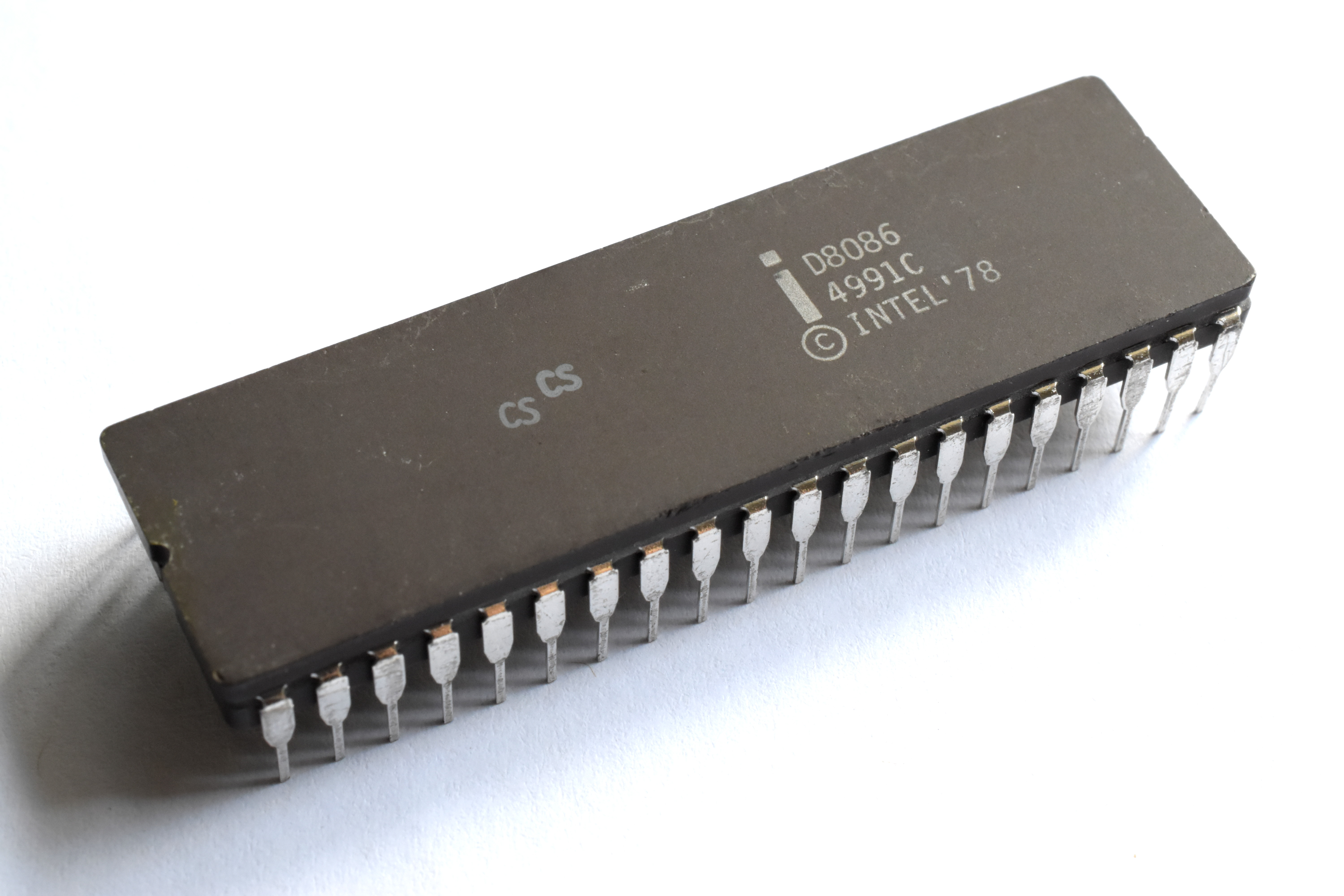
Intel D8086

==== 8086 ====
- Introduced June 8, 1978
- Clock rates:
  - 5 MHz, 0.33 MIPS
  - 8 MHz, 0.66 MIPS
  - 10 MHz, 0.75 MIPS
- The memory is divided into odd and even banks. It accesses both banks concurrently to read 16 bits of data in one memory cycle
- Data bus width: 16 bits, address bus: 20 bits, multiplexed
- 29,000 transistors at 3 μm
- Addressable memory: 1 megabyte (1024^{2} B)
- Up to 10× the performance of 8080
- First used in the Compaq Deskpro IBM PC-compatible computers. Later used in portable computing, and in the IBM PS/2 Model 25 and Model 30. Also used in the AT&T PC6300 / Olivetti M24, a popular IBM PC-compatible (predating the IBM PS/2 line) and the WANG PC.
- Used segment registers to access more than 64 KB of data at once.
- The first x86 CPU
- Later renamed the iAPX 86

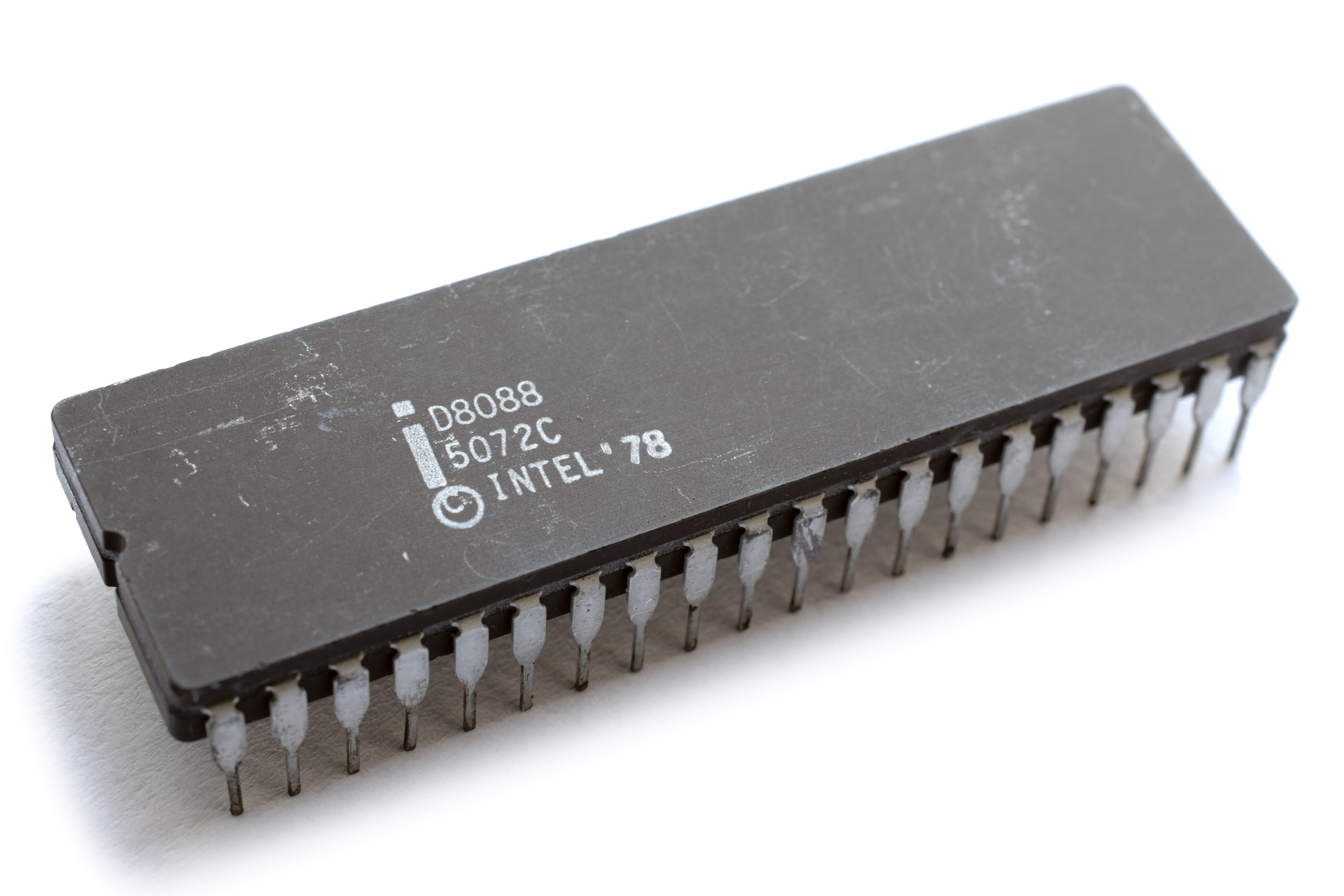
Intel D8088

==== 8088 ====
- Introduced June 1, 1979
- Clock rates:
  - 4.77 MHz, 0.33 MIPS
  - 8 MHz, 0.66 MIPS
- 16-bit internal architecture
- External data bus width: 8 bits, address bus: 20 bits, lower 8 bits multiplexed
- 29,000 transistors at 3 μm
- Addressable memory: 1 megabyte
- Identical to 8086 except for its 8-bit external bus (hence an 8 instead of a 6 at the end); identical Execution Unit (EU), different Bus Interface Unit (BIU)
- Used in IBM PC and PC-XT and compatibles
- Later renamed the iAPX 88

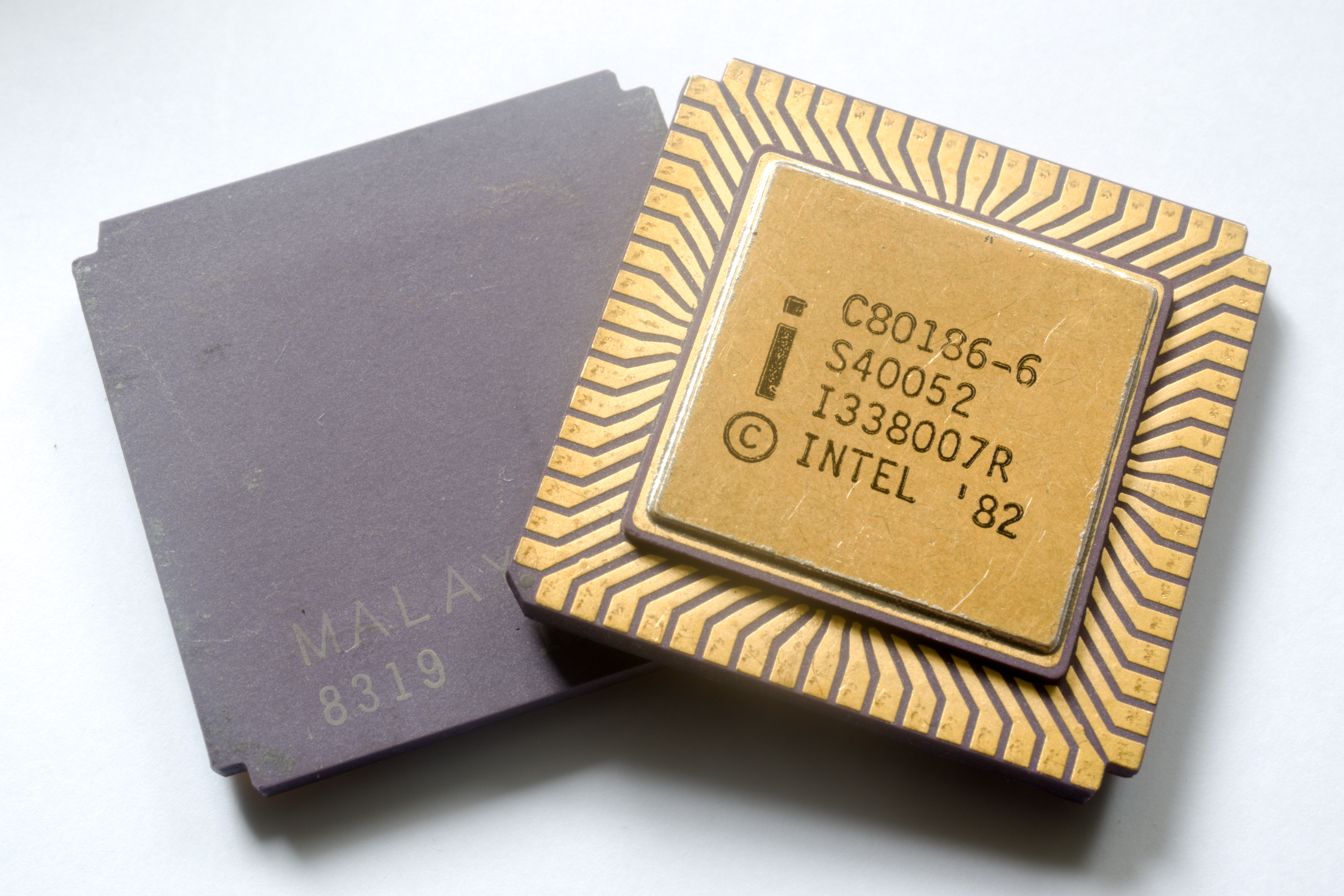
Intel C80186 6 MHz

==== 80186 ====
- Introduced 1982
- Clock rates
  - 6 MHz, > 1 MIPS
- 55,000 transistors
- Included two timers, a DMA controller, and an interrupt controller on the chip in addition to the processor (these were at fixed addresses which differed from the IBM PC, although it was used by several PC compatible vendors such as Australian company Cleveland)
- Added a few opcodes and exceptions to the 8086 design, otherwise identical instruction set to 8086 and 8088
  - BOUND, ENTER, LEAVE
  - INS, OUTS
  - IMUL imm, PUSH imm, PUSHA, POPA
  - RCL/RCR/ROL/ROR/SHL/SHR/SAL/SAR reg, imm
- Address calculation and shift operations are faster than 8086
- Used mostly in embedded applications – controllers, point-of-sale systems, terminals, and the like
- Used in several non-PC compatible computers including RM Nimbus, Tandy 2000, and CP/M 86 Televideo PM16 server
- Later renamed to iAPX 186

==== 80188 ====
- A version of the 80186 with an 8-bit external data bus
- Later renamed the iAPX 188

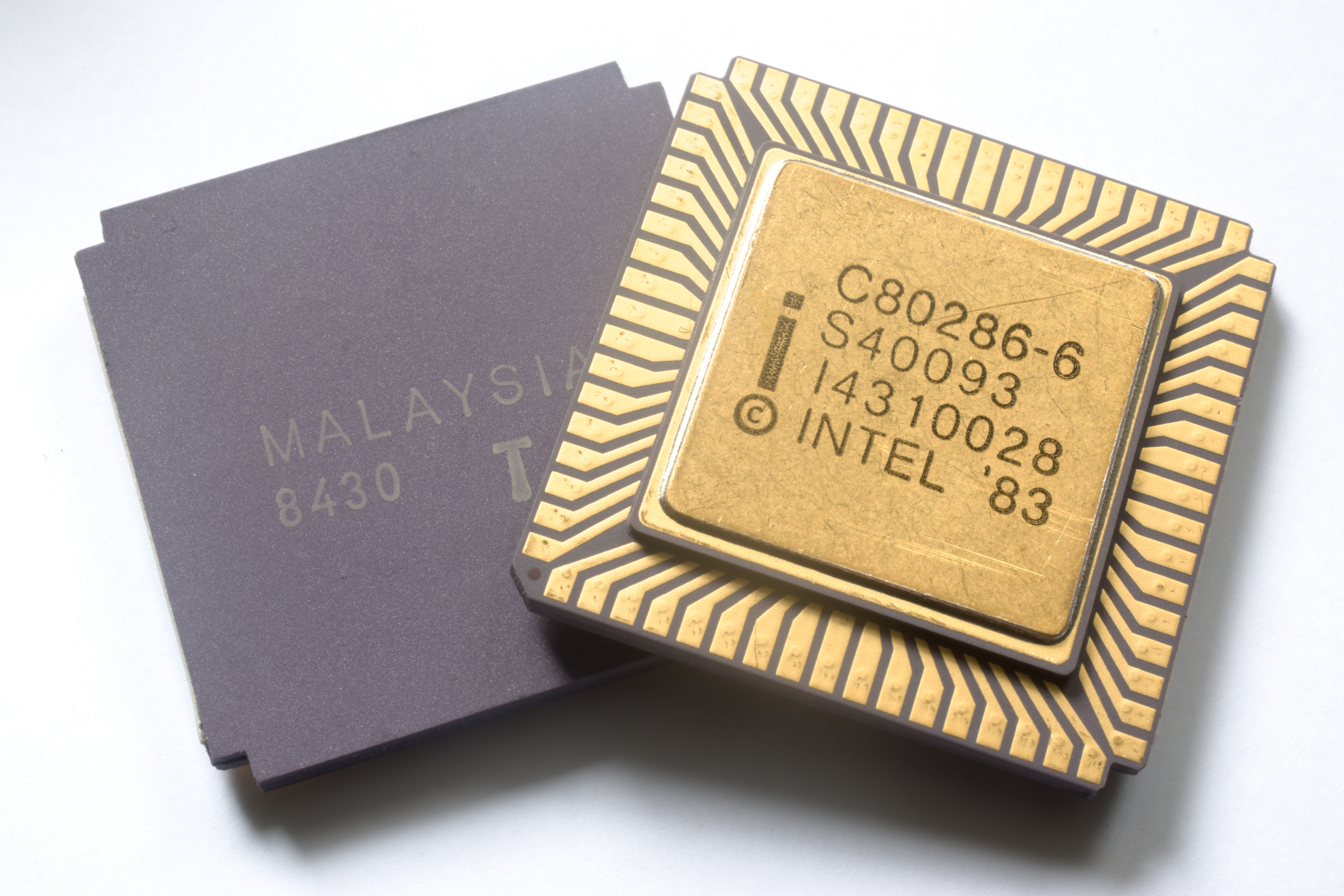
Intel C80286 6 MHz

==== 80286 ====
- Introduced February 1, 1982
- Clock rates:
  - 6 MHz, 0.9 MIPS
  - 8 MHz, 10 MHz, 1.5 MIPS
  - 12.5 MHz, 2.66 MIPS
  - 16 MHz, 20 MHz and 25 MHz available.
- Data bus width: 16 bits, address bus: 24 bits
- Included memory protection hardware to support multitasking operating systems with per-process address space.
- 134,000 transistors at 1.5 μm
- Addressable memory 16 MB
- Added protected-mode features to 8086 with essentially the same instruction set
- 3–6× the performance of the 8086
- Widely used in IBM PC AT and AT clones contemporary to it

=== 32-bit processors: the non-x86 microprocessors ===
==== iAPX 432 ====
- Introduced January 1, 1981 as Intel's first 32-bit microprocessor
- Multi-chip CPU
- Object/capability architecture
- Microcoded operating system primitives
- One terabyte virtual address space
- Hardware support for fault tolerance
- Two-chip General Data Processor (GDP), consists of 43201 and 43202
- 43203 Interface Processor (IP) interfaces to I/O subsystem
- 43204 Bus Interface Unit (BIU) simplifies building multiprocessor systems
- 43205 Memory Control Unit (MCU)
- Architecture and execution unit internal data base paths: 32 bits
- Clock rates:
  - 5 MHz
  - 7 MHz
  - 8 MHz

==== i960 a.k.a. 80960 ====
- Introduced April 5, 1988
- RISC-like 32-bit architecture
- Predominantly used in embedded systems
- Evolved from the capability processor developed for the BiiN joint venture with Siemens
- Many variants identified by two-letter suffixes

==== i860 a.k.a. 80860 ====
- Initial version 80860XR Introduced February 26, 1989
- RISC 32/64-bit architecture, with floating point pipeline characteristics very visible to programmer
- Used in the Intel iPSC/860 Hypercube parallel supercomputer
- Mid-life kicker in the 80860XP processor (primarily a speed bump, some refinement/extension of instruction set)
- Used in the Intel Delta massively parallel supercomputer prototype, emplaced at California Institute of Technology
- Used in the Intel Paragon massively parallel supercomputer, emplaced at Sandia National Laboratory

==== XScale ====
- Introduced August 23, 2000
- 32-bit RISC microprocessor based on the ARM architecture
- Many variants, such as the PXA2xx applications processors, IOP3xx I/O processors and IXP2xxx and IXP4xx network processors

=== 32-bit processors: the 80386 range ===
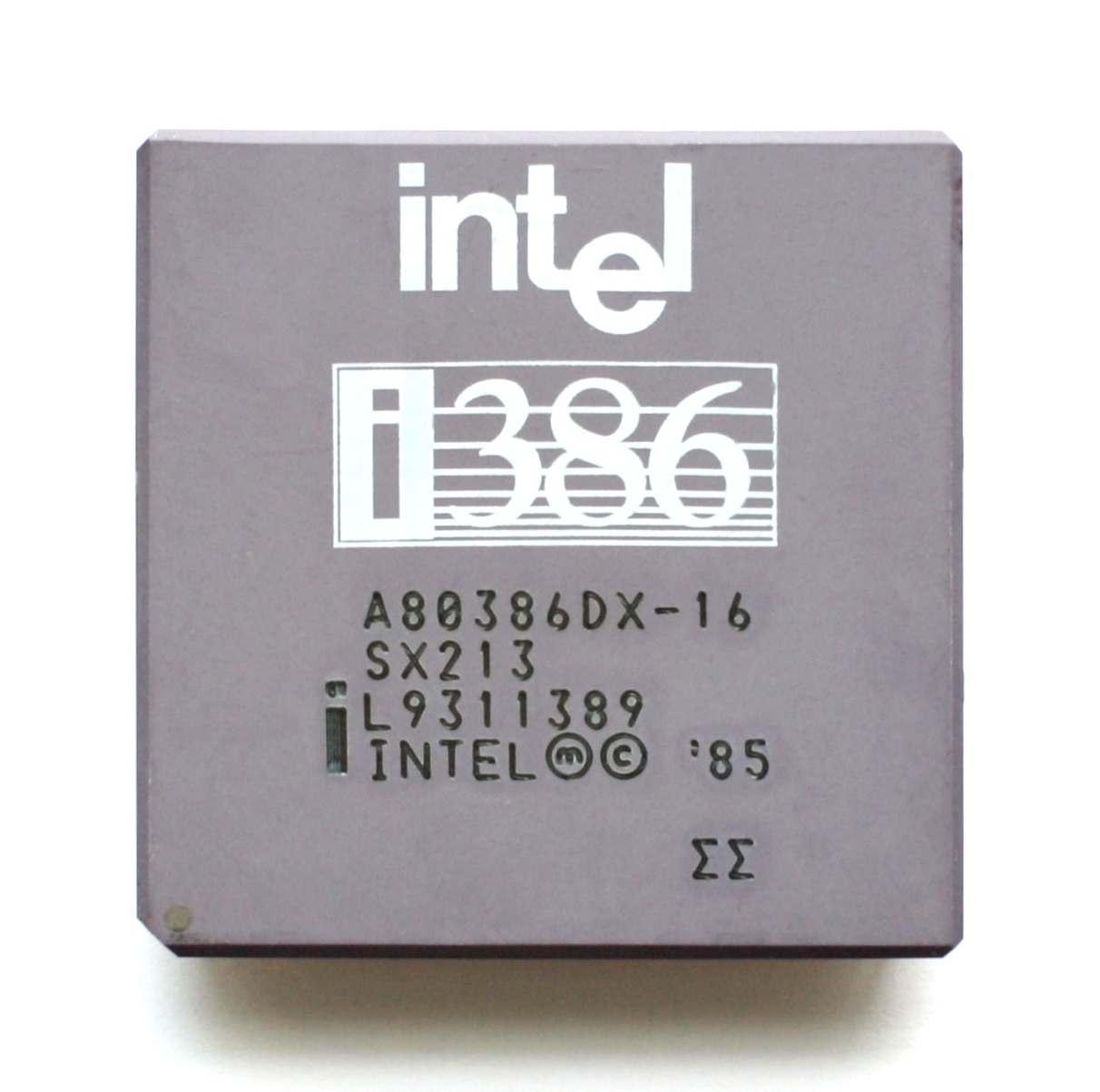
Intel 80386DX

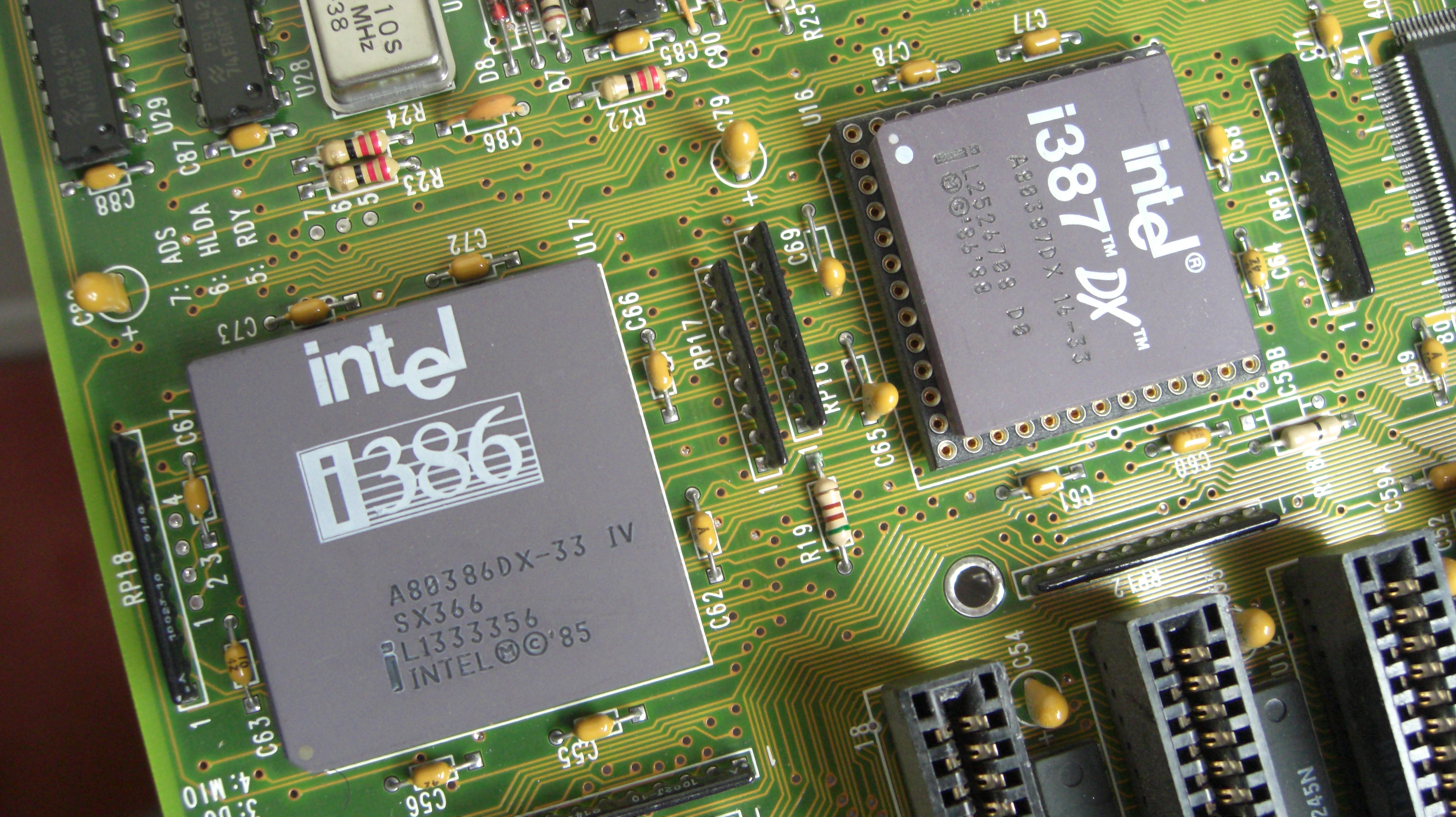
Intel 80386DX with Intel 387 math processor

==== 80386DX ====
- Introduced October 17, 1985
- Clock rates:
  - 16 MHz, 5 MIPS
  - 20 MHz, 6 to 7 MIPS, introduced February 16, 1987
  - 25 MHz, 7.5 MIPS, introduced April 4, 1988
  - 33 MHz, 9.9 MIPS (9.4 SPECint92 on Compaq/i 16 KB L2), introduced April 10, 1989
- Data bus width: 32 bits, address bus: 32 bits
- 275,000 transistors at 1 μm
- Addressable memory 4 GB (4 × 1024^{3} B = 2^{32})
- Virtual memory 64 TB (64 × 1024^{4} B = 2^{46})
- First x86 chip to handle 32-bit data sets
- Reworked and expanded memory protection support including paged virtual memory and virtual-86 mode, features required at the time by Xenix and Unix. This memory capability spurred the development and availability of OS/2 and is a fundamental requirement for modern operating systems like Linux, Windows, and macOS
- First used by Compaq in the Deskpro 386. Used in desktop computing
- Unlike the DX naming convention of the 486 chips, it had no math co-processor
- Later renamed Intel386 DX

==== 80386SX ====
- Introduced June 16, 1988
- Clock rates:
  - 16 MHz, 2.5 MIPS
  - 20 MHz, 3.1 MIPS, introduced January 25, 1989
  - 25 MHz, 3.9 MIPS, introduced January 25, 1989
  - 33 MHz, 5.1 MIPS, introduced October 26, 1992
- 32-bit internal architecture
- External data bus width: 16 bits
- External address bus width: 24 bits
- 275,000 transistors at 1 μm
- Addressable memory 16 MB
- Virtual memory 64 TB
- Narrower buses enable low-cost 32-bit processing
- Used in entry-level desktop and portable computing
- No math co-processor
- No commercial software used protected mode or virtual storage for many years
- Later renamed Intel386 SX

==== 80376 ====
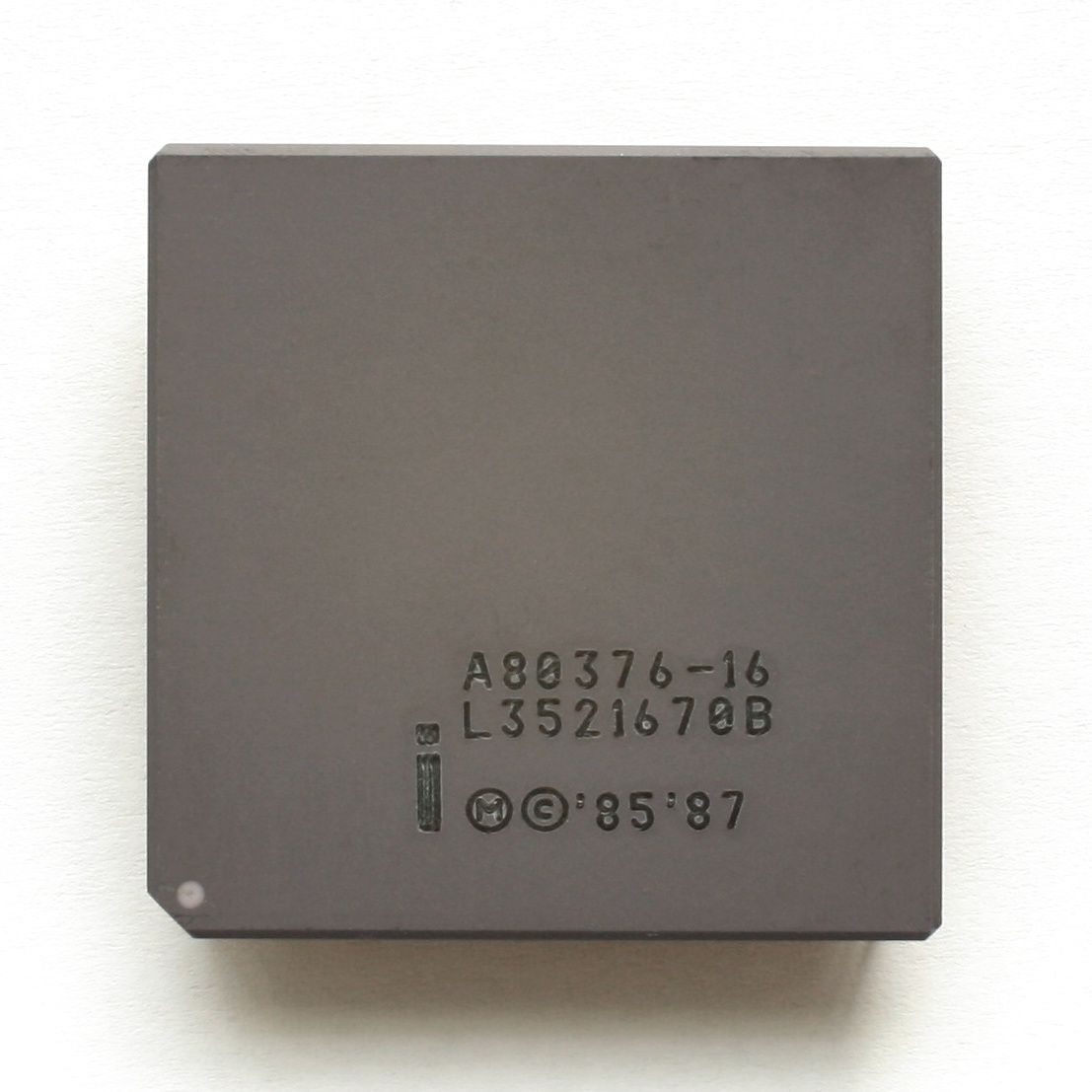
The Intel i376 is an embedded version of the i386SX.

- Introduced January 16, 1989; discontinued June 15, 2001
- Variant of 386SX intended for embedded systems
- No "real mode", starts up directly in "protected mode"
- Replaced by much more successful 80386EX from 1994

==== 80386SL ====
- Introduced October 15, 1990
- Clock rates:
  - 20 MHz, 4.21 MIPS
  - 25 MHz, 5.3 MIPS, introduced September 30, 1991
- 32-bit internal architecture
- External bus width: 16 bits
- 855,000 transistors at 1 μm
- Addressable memory 4 GB
- Virtual memory 64 TB
- First chip specifically made for portable computers because of low power consumption of chip
- Highly integrated, includes cache, bus, and memory controllers

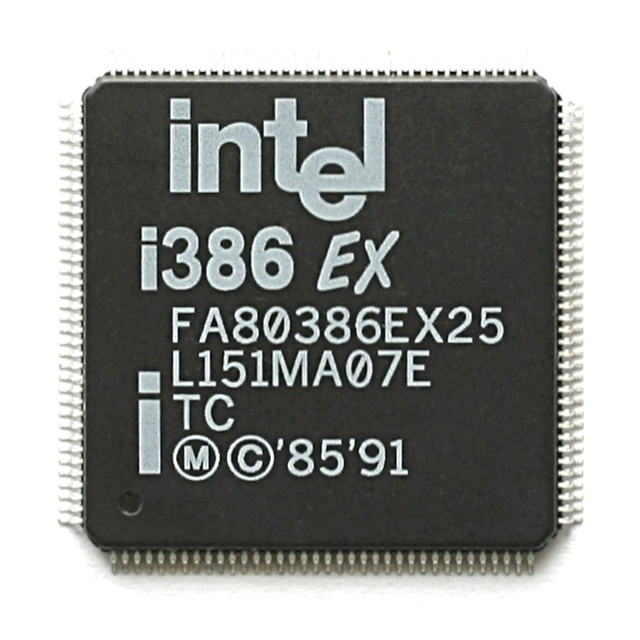
Intel 80386EX

==== 80386EX ====
- Introduced August 1994
- Variant of 80386SX intended for embedded systems
- Static core (i.e. may run as slowly (and thus, power efficiently) as desired) down to full halt
- On-chip peripherals:
  - Clock and power management
  - Timers/counters
  - Watchdog timer
  - Serial I/O units (sync and async) and parallel I/O
  - DMA
  - RAM refresh
  - JTAG test logic
- Significantly more successful than the 80376
- Used aboard several orbiting satellites and microsatellites
- Used in NASA's FlightLinux project

=== 32-bit processors: the 80486 range ===
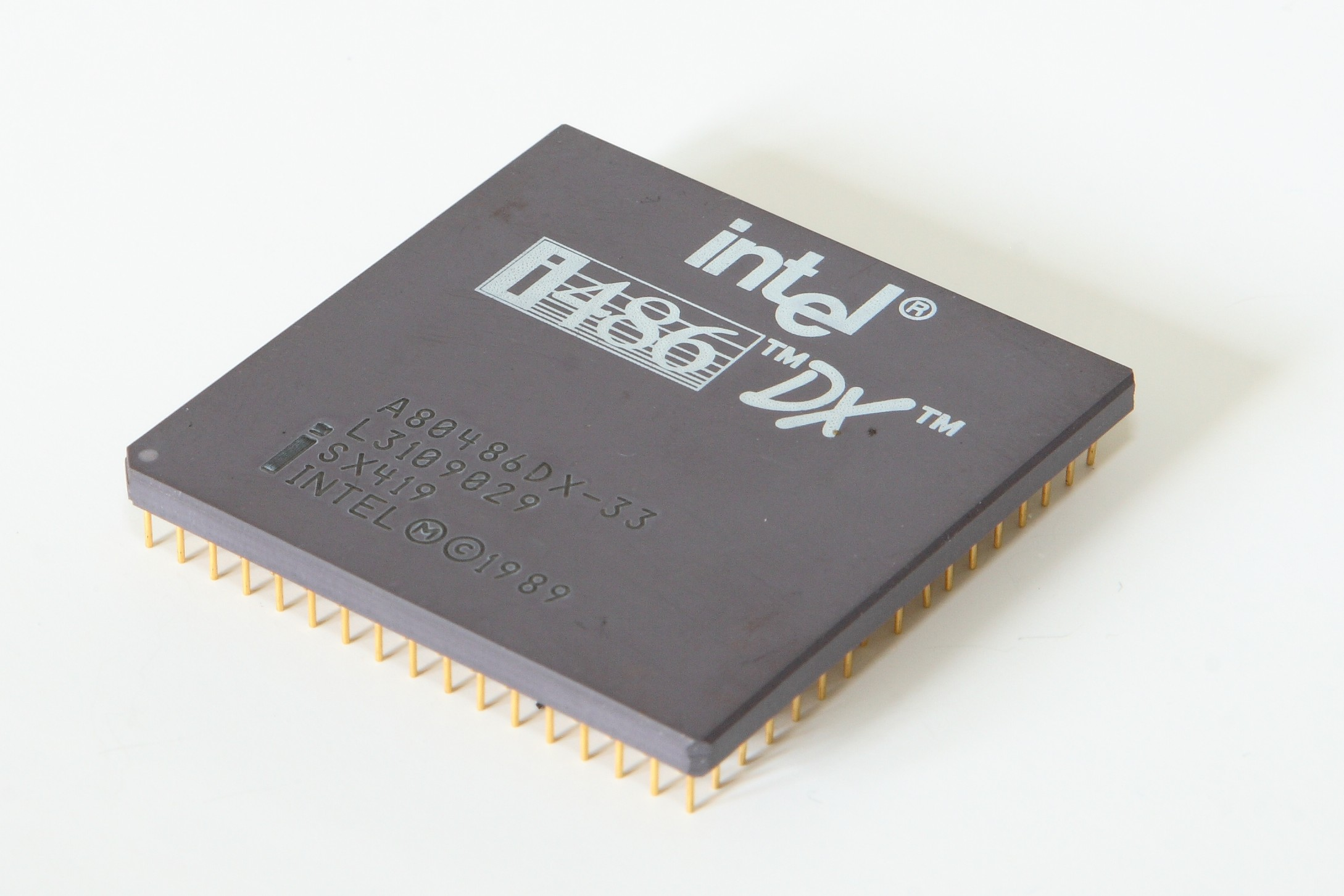
Intel 80486DX 33 MHz

==== 80486DX ====
- Introduced April 10, 1989
- Clock rates:
  - 25 MHz, 20 MIPS (16.8 SPECint92, 7.40 SPECfp92)
  - 33 MHz, 27 MIPS (22.4 SPECint92 on Micronics M4P 128 KB L2), introduced May 7, 1990
  - 50 MHz, 41 MIPS (33.4 SPECint92, 14.5 SPECfp92 on Compaq/50L 256 KB L2), introduced June 24, 1991
- Bus width: 32 bits
- 1.2 million transistors at 1 μm; the 50 MHz was at 0.8 μm
- Addressable memory 4 GB
- Virtual memory 64 TB
- Level 1 cache of 8 KB on chip
- Math coprocessor on chip
- 50× performance of the 8088
- Officially named Intel486 DX
- Used in desktop computing and servers
- Family 4 model 1

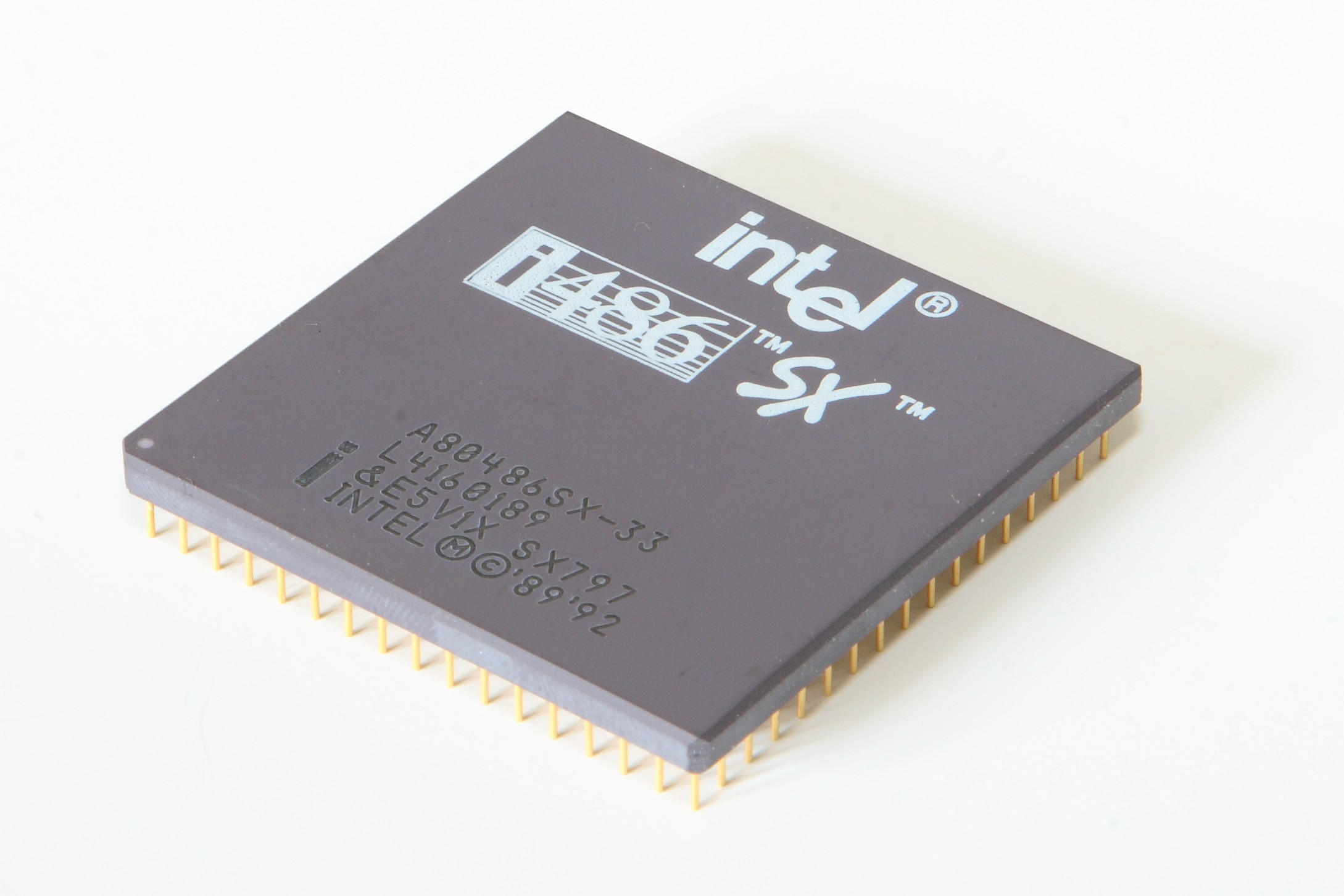
Intel 80486SX 33 MHz

==== 80486SX ====
- Introduced April 22, 1991
- Clock rates:
  - 16 MHz, 13 MIPS
  - 20 MHz, 16.5 MIPS, introduced September 16, 1991
  - 25 MHz, 20 MIPS (12 SPECint92), introduced September 16, 1991
  - 33 MHz, 27 MIPS (15.86 SPECint92), introduced September 21, 1992
- Bus width: 32 bits
- 1.185 million transistors at 1 μm and 900,000 at 0.8 μm
- Addressable memory 4 GB
- Virtual memory 64 TB
- Identical in design to 486DX but without a math coprocessor. The first version was an 80486DX with disabled math coprocessor in the chip and different pin configuration. If the user needed math coprocessor capabilities, they must add 487SX which was actually a 486DX with different pin configuration to prevent the user from installing a 486DX instead of 487SX, so with this configuration 486SX+487SX you had 2 identical CPU's with only 1 effectively turned on
- Officially named Intel486 SX
- Used in low-cost entry to 486 CPU desktop computing, as well as extensively in low cost mobile computing
- Upgradable with the Intel OverDrive processor
- Family 4 model 2

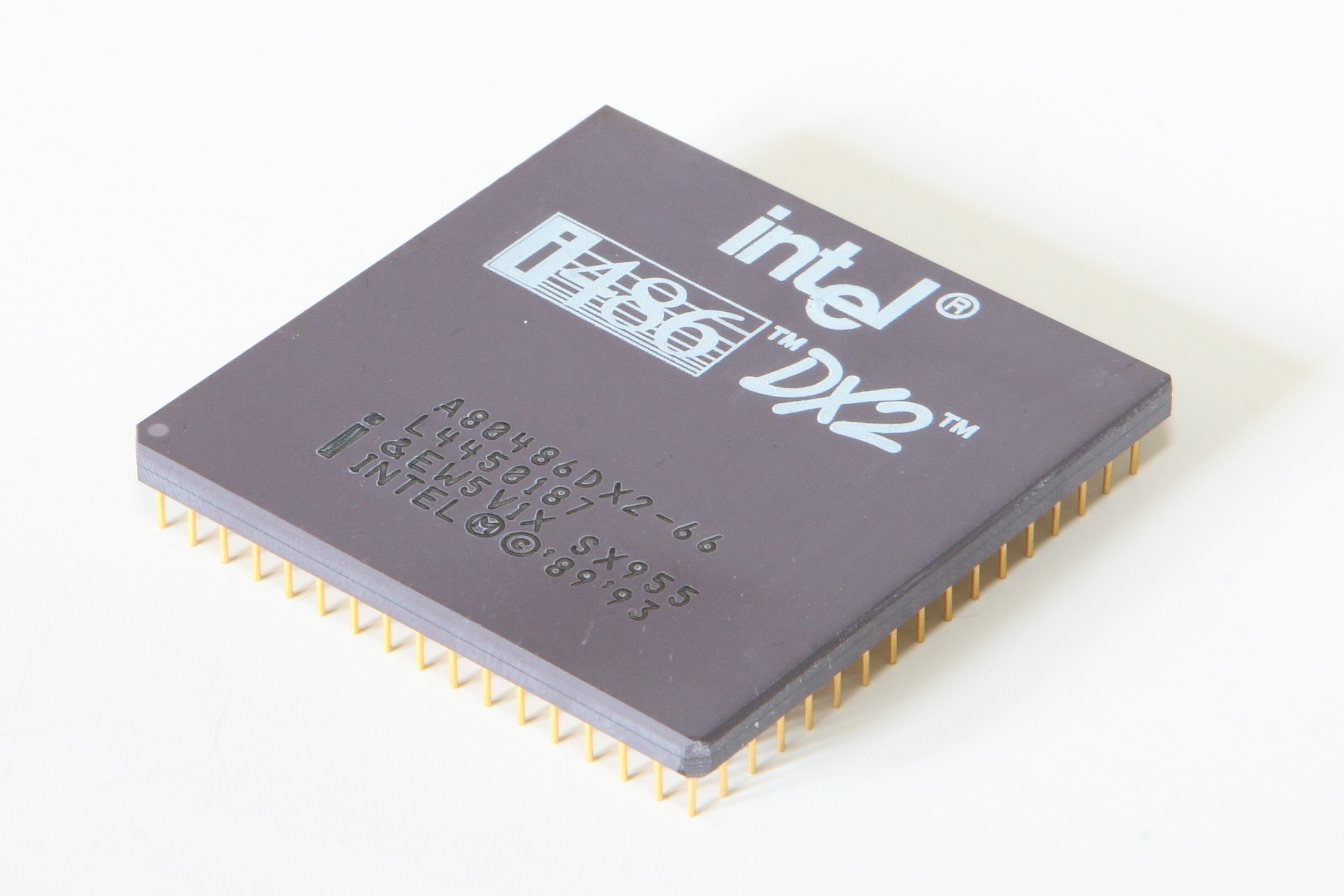
Intel 80486DX2 66 MHz

==== 80486DX2 ====
- Introduced March 3, 1992
- Runs at twice the speed of the external bus (FSB)
- Socket 3
- Clock rates:
  - 40 MHz
  - 50 MHz, 41 MIPS
  - 66 MHz, 54 MIPS
- Officially named Intel486 DX2
- Family 4 model 3

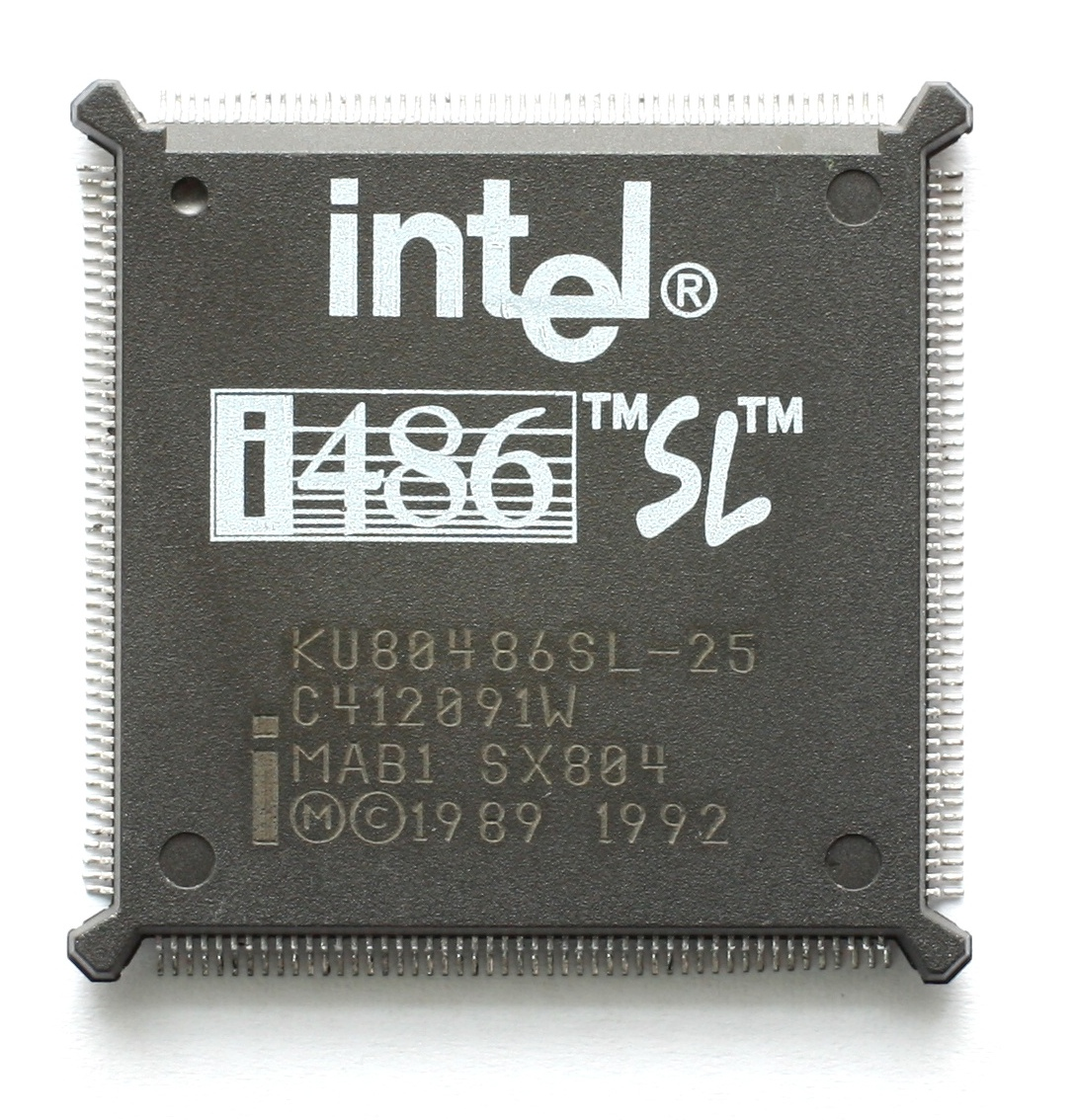
Intel 80486SL

==== 80486SL ====
- Introduced November 9, 1992
- Clock rates:
  - 20 MHz, 15.4 MIPS
  - 25 MHz, 19 MIPS
  - 33 MHz, 25 MIPS
- Bus width: 32 bits
- 1.4 million transistors at 0.8 μm
- Addressable memory 4 GB
- Virtual memory 64 TB
- Officially named Intel486 SL
- Used in notebook computers
- Family 4 model 4

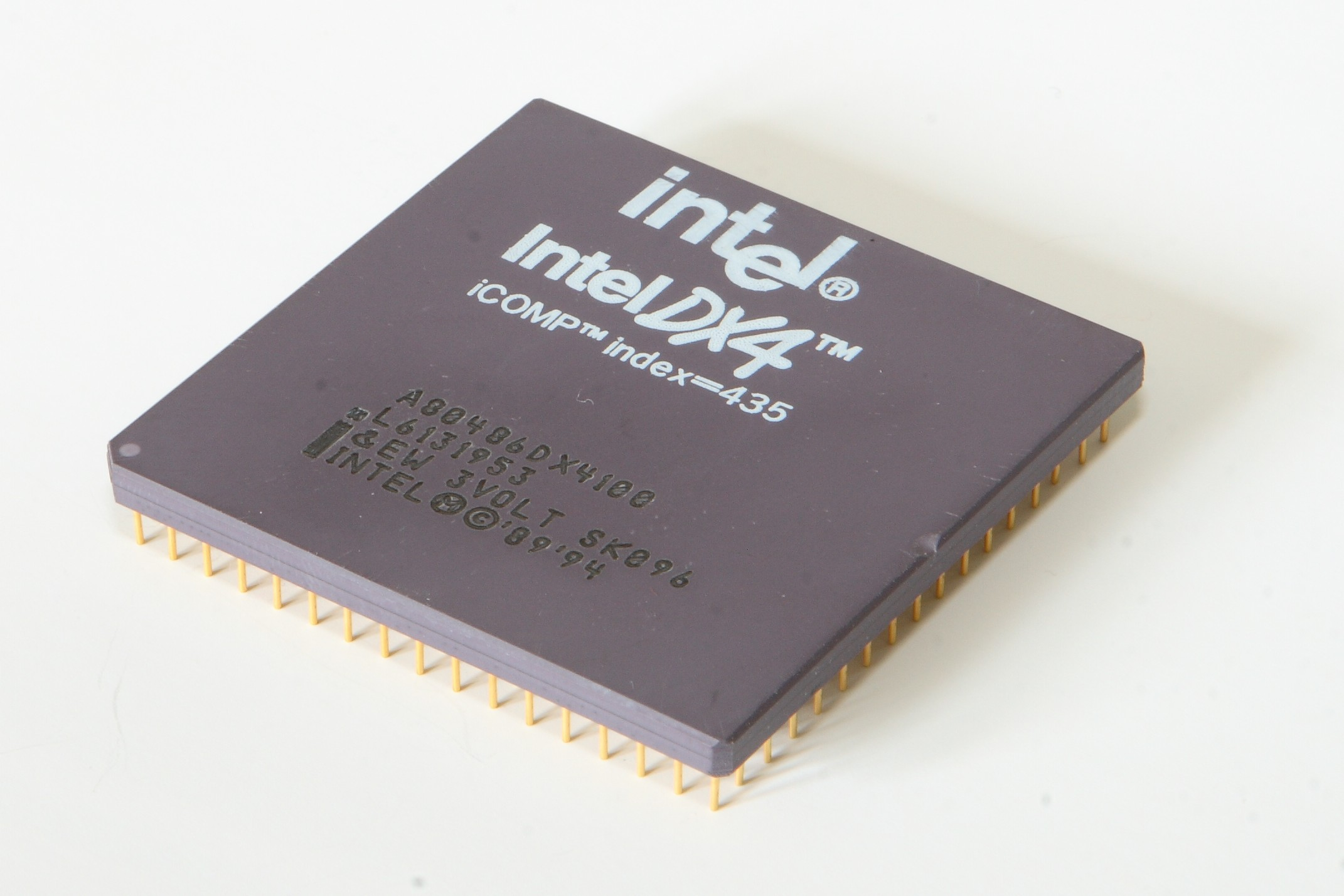
Intel 80486DX4 100 MHz

==== 80486DX4 ====
- Introduced March 7, 1994
- Clock rates:
  - 75 MHz, 53 MIPS (41.3 SPECint92, 20.1 SPECfp92 on Micronics M4P 256 KB L2)
  - 100 MHz, 70.7 MIPS (54.59 SPECint92, 26.91 SPECfp92 on Micronics M4P 256 KB L2)
- 1.6 million transistors at 0.6 μm
- Bus width: 32 bits
- Addressable memory 4 GB
- Virtual memory 64 TB
- Socket 3 168-pin PGA Package, or 208 sq. ftP package
- Officially named Intel486 DX4
- Used in high performance entry-level desktops and value notebooks
- Family 4 model 8

=== 32-bit processors: P5 microarchitecture ===
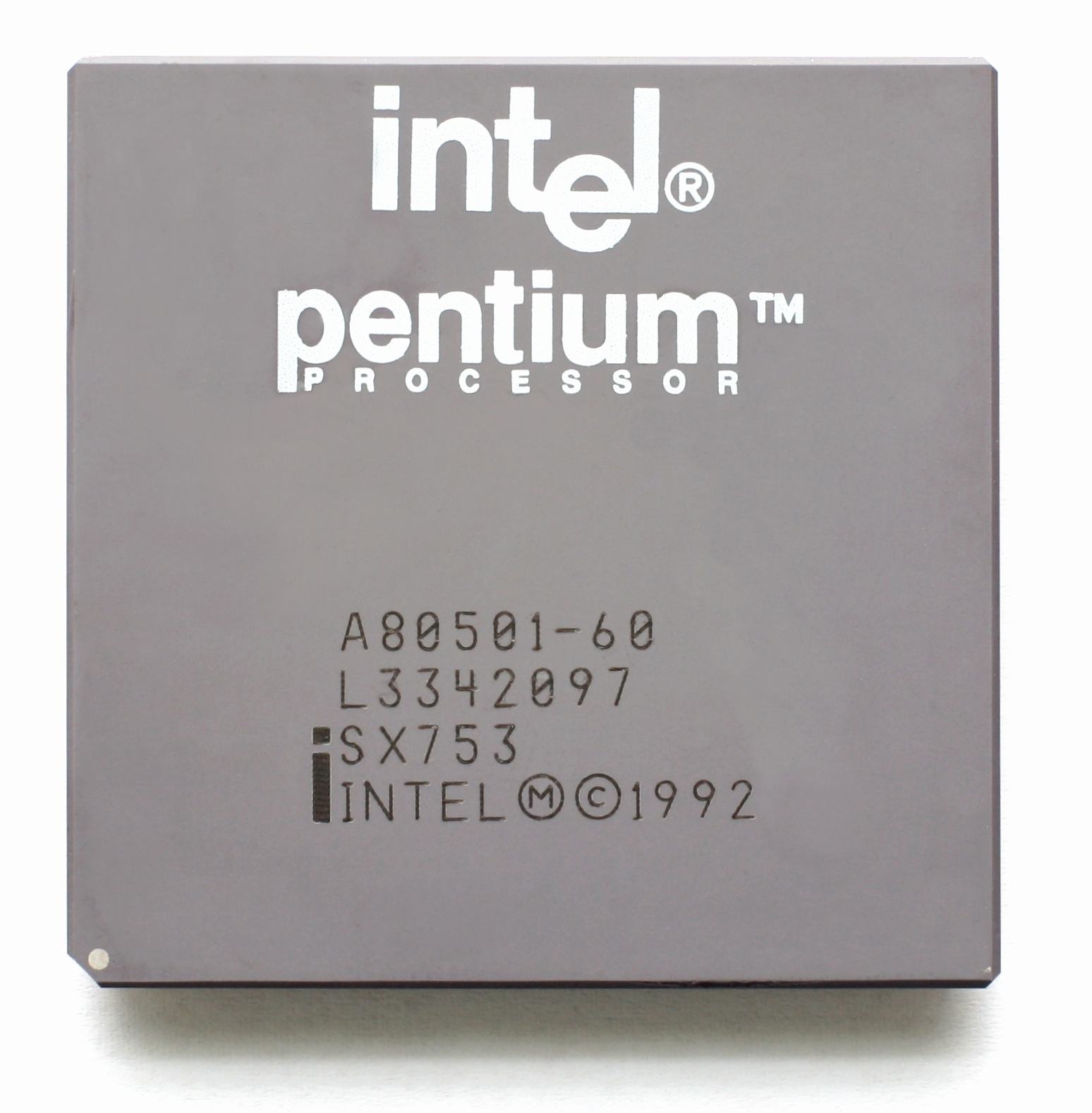
Intel Pentium P5 (A80501) 60 MHz, without GoldCap

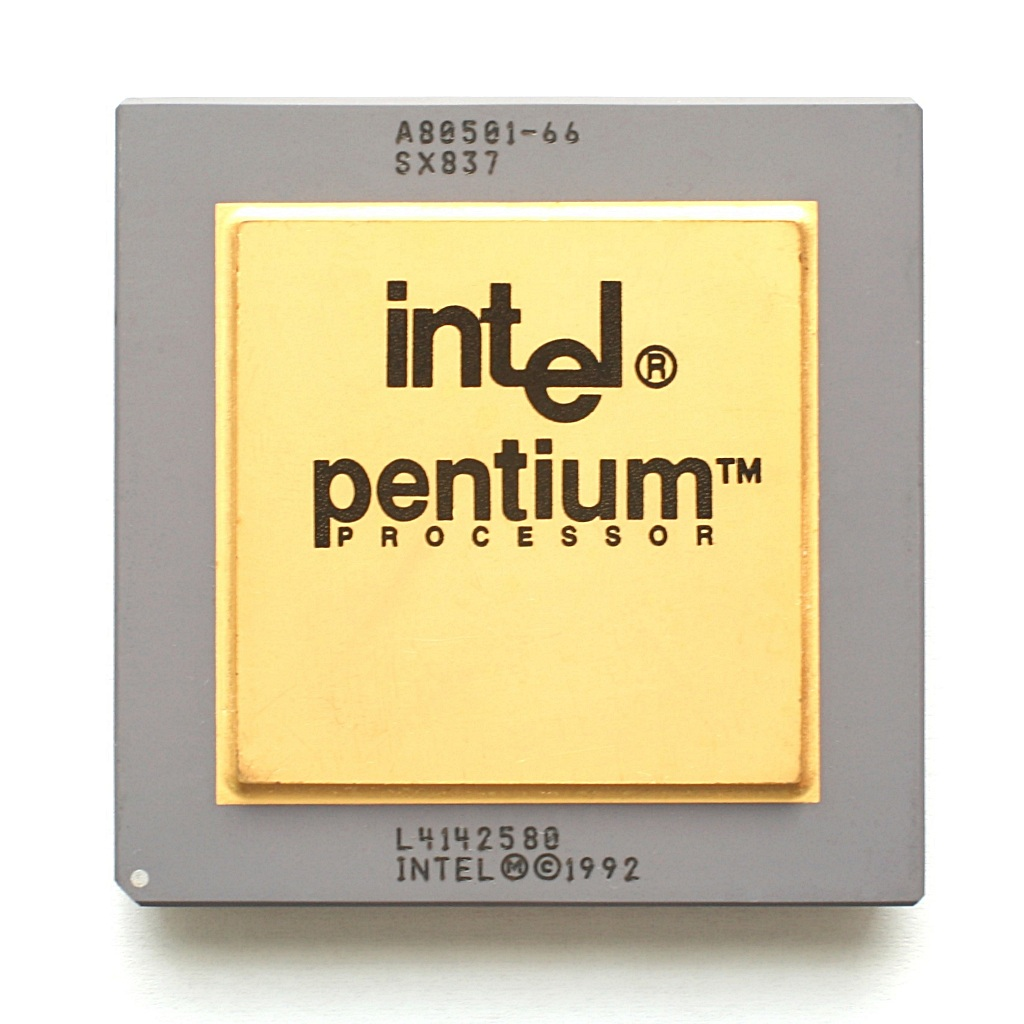
Intel Pentium P5 (A80501) 66 MHz, with GoldCap

==== Original Pentium ====
- Introduced March 22, 1993
- Bus width: 64 bits
- System bus clock rate 60 or 66 MHz
- Address bus: 32 bits
- Addressable memory 4 GB
- Virtual memory 64 TB
- Superscalar architecture
- Runs on 3.3 volts (except the very first generation "P5")
- Used in desktops
- 8 KB of instruction cache
- 8 KB of data cache
- P5 – 0.8 μm process technology
  - Introduced March 22, 1993
  - 3.1 million transistors
  - The only Pentium to run on 5 Volts
  - Socket 4 273 pin PGA Package
  - Package dimensions 2.16 in × 2.16 in
  - Family 5 model 1
  - Variants
    - 60 MHz, 100 MIPS (70.4 SPECint92, 55.1 SPECfp92 on Xpress 256 KB L2)
    - 66 MHz, 112 MIPS (77.9 SPECint92, 63.6 SPECfp92 on Xpress 256 KB L2)
- P54 – 0.6 μm process technology
  - Socket 5 296/320-pin PGA package
  - 3.2 million transistors
  - Variants
    - 75 MHz, 126.5 MIPS (2.31 SPECint95, 2.02 SPECfp95 on Gateway P5 256K L2)
      - Introduced October 10, 1994
    - 90, 100 MHz, 149.8 and 166.3 MIPS respectively (2.74 SPECint95, 2.39 SPECfp95 on Gateway P5 256K L2 and 3.30 SPECint95, 2.59 SPECfp95 on Xpress 1ML2 respectively)
      - Introduced March 7, 1994
- P54CQS – 0.35 μm process technology
  - Socket 5 296/320 pin PGA package
  - 3.2 million transistors
  - Variants
    - 120 MHz, 203 MIPS (3.72 SPECint95, 2.81 SPECfp95 on Xpress 1 MB L2)
      - Introduced March 27, 1995
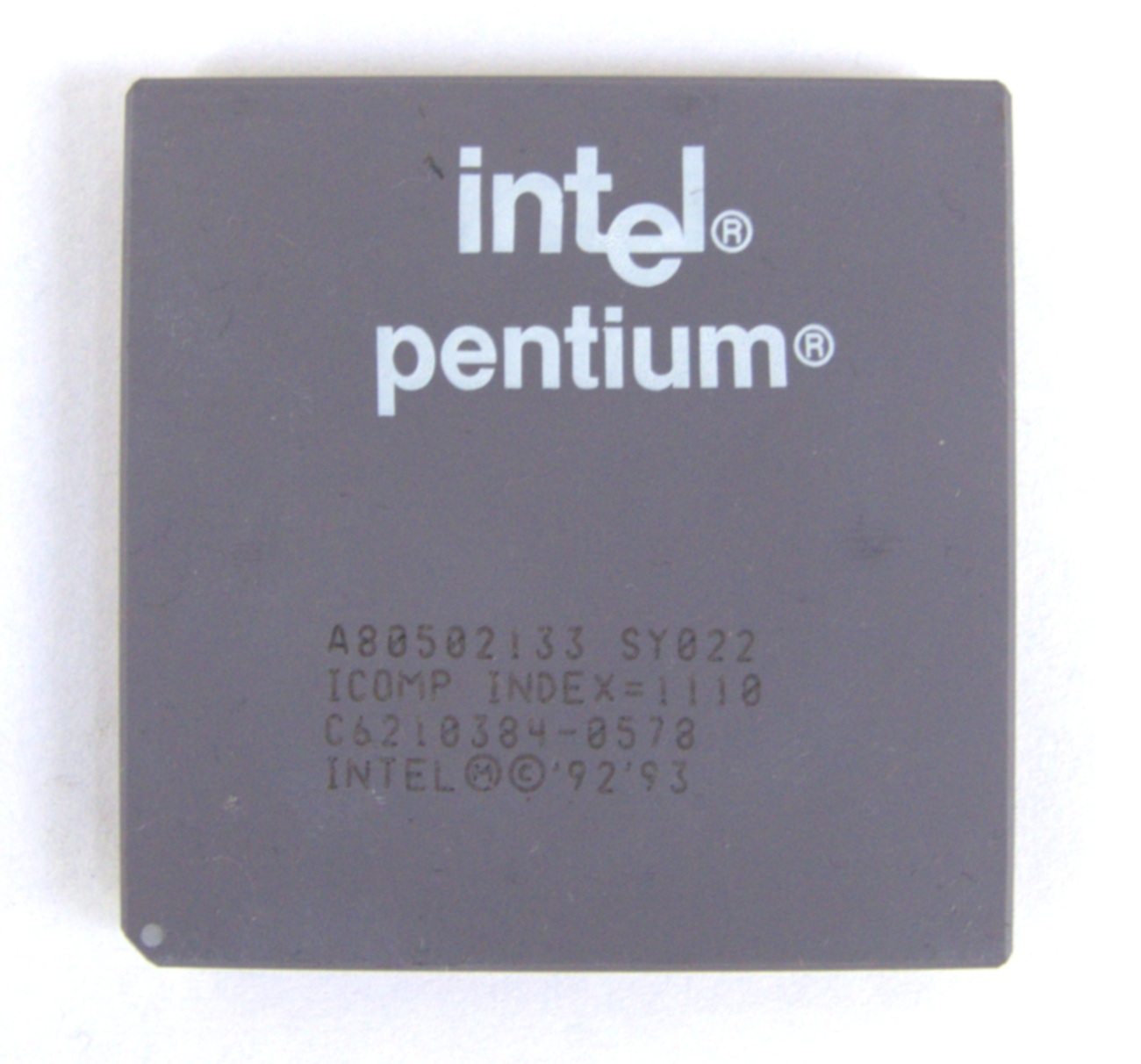
- Intel Pentium P54 133 MHz
  P54CS – 0.35 μm process technology
  - 3.3 million transistors
  - 90 mm^{2} die size
  - Family 5 model 2
  - Variants
  - Socket 5 296/320-pin PGA package
    - 133 MHz, 218.9 MIPS (4.14 SPECint95, 3.12 SPECfp95 on Xpress 1 MB L2)
      - Introduced June 12, 1995
    - 150, 166 MHz, 230 and 247 MIPS respectively
      - Introduced January 4, 1996
  - Socket 7 296/321-pin PGA package
    - 200 MHz, 270 MIPS (5.47 SPECint95, 3.68 SPECfp95)
      - Introduced June 10, 1996

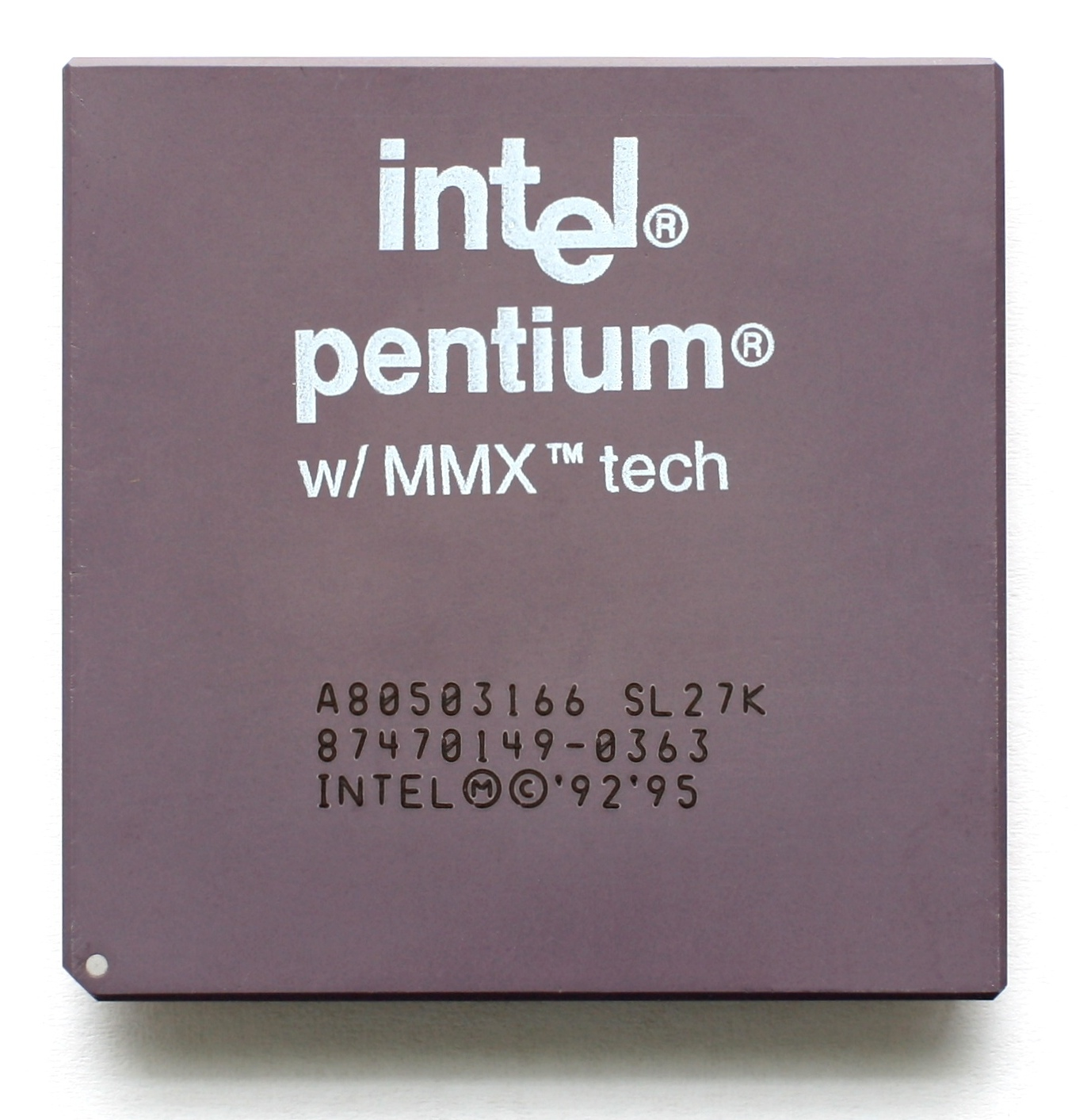
Intel Pentium P55C 166 MHz

==== Pentium with MMX Technology ====
- P55C – 0.35 μm process technology
  - Introduced January 8, 1997
  - Intel MMX (instruction set) support
  - Socket 7 296/321 pin PGA (pin grid array) package
  - 16 KB L1 instruction cache
  - 16 KB data cache
  - 4.5 million transistors
  - System bus clock rate 66 MHz
  - Basic P55C is family 5 model 4, mobile are family 5 model 7 and 8
  - Variants
    - 166, 200 MHz introduced January 8, 1997
    - 233 MHz introduced June 2, 1997
    - 133 MHz (Mobile)
    - 166, 266 MHz (Mobile) introduced January 12, 1998
    - 200, 233 MHz (Mobile) introduced September 8, 1997
    - 300 MHz (Mobile) introduced January 7, 1999

=== 32-bit processors: P6/Pentium M microarchitecture ===
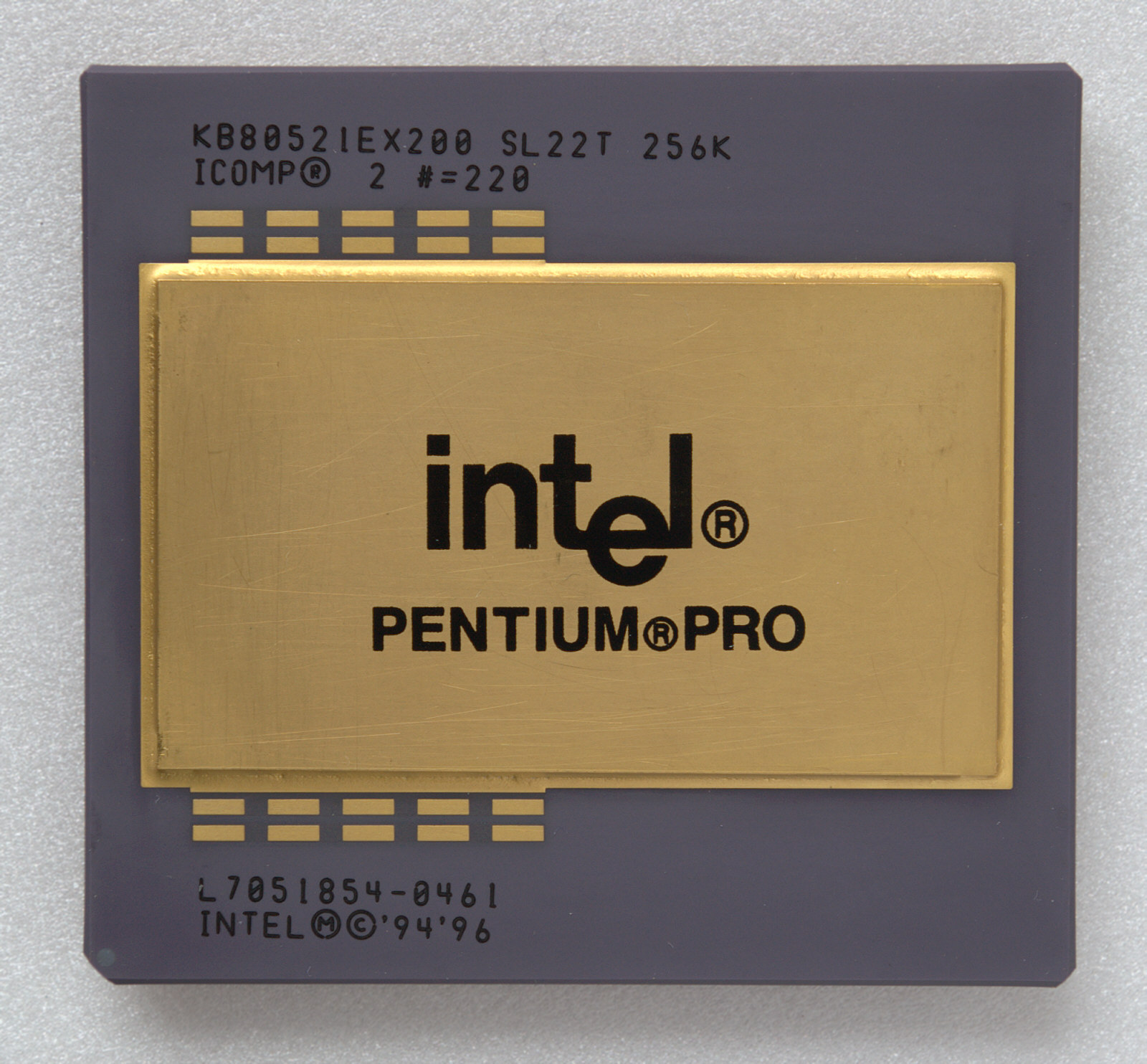
Intel Pentium Pro 200 MHz

==== Pentium Pro ====
- Introduced November 1, 1995
- Multichip Module (2 die)
- Precursor to Pentium II and III
- Primarily used in server systems
- Socket 8 processor package (387 pins; Dual SPGA)
- 5.5 million transistors
- Family 6 model 1
- 0.6 μm process technology
  - 16 KB L1 cache
  - 256 KB integrated L2 cache
  - 60 MHz system bus clock rate
  - Variants
    - 150 MHz
- 0.35 μm process technology, (two die, a 0.35 μm CPU with 0.6 μm L2 cache)
  - 5.5 million transistors
  - 512 KB or 256 KB integrated L2 cache
  - 60 or 66 MHz system bus clock rate
  - Variants
    - 150 MHz (60 MHz bus clock rate, 256 KB 0.6 μm cache) introduced November 1, 1995
    - 166 MHz (66 MHz bus clock rate, 512 KB 0.35 μm cache) introduced November 1, 1995
    - 180 MHz (60 MHz bus clock rate, 256 KB 0.6 μm cache) introduced November 1, 1995
    - 200 MHz (66 MHz bus clock rate, 256 KB 0.6 μm cache) introduced November 1, 1995
    - 200 MHz (66 MHz bus clock rate, 512 KB 0.35 μm cache) introduced November 1, 1995
    - 200 MHz (66 MHz bus clock rate, 1 MB 0.35 μm cache) introduced August 18, 1997

==== Pentium II ====
- Introduced May 7, 1997
- Pentium Pro with MMX and improved 16-bit performance
- 242-pin Slot 1 (SEC) processor package
- Voltage identification pins
- 7.5 million transistors
- 32 KB L1 cache
- 512 KB 1/2 frequency external L2 cache
- The Performance Enhanced mobile Pentium II (codenamed Dixon) had a full-speed 256 KB L2 cache
- Klamath – 0.35 μm process technology (233, 266, 300 MHz)
  - 66 MHz system bus clock rate
  - Family 6 model 3
  - Variants
    - 233, 266, 300 MHz introduced May 7, 1997
- Deschutes – 0.25 μm process technology (333, 350, 400, 450 MHz)
  - Introduced January 26, 1998
  - 66 MHz system bus clock rate (333 MHz variant), 100 MHz system bus clock rate for all subsequent models
  - Family 6 model 5
  - Variants
    - 333 MHz introduced January 26, 1998
    - 350, 400 MHz introduced April 15, 1998
    - 450 MHz introduced August 24, 1998
    - 233, 266 MHz (Mobile) introduced April 2, 1998
    - 333 MHz Pentium II Overdrive processor for Socket 8 Introduced August 10, 1998
    - 300 MHz (Mobile) introduced September 9, 1998
    - 333 MHz (Mobile) introduced January 25, 1999

==== Celeron (Pentium II–based) ====
- Covington – 0.25 μm process technology
  - Introduced April 15, 1998
  - 242-pin Slot 1 SEPP (Single Edge Processor Package)
  - 7.5 million transistors
  - 66 MHz system bus clock rate
  - Slot 1
  - 32 KB L1 cache
  - No L2 cache
  - Variants
    - 266 MHz introduced April 15, 1998
    - 300 MHz introduced June 9, 1998
- Mendocino – 0.25 μm process technology
  - Introduced August 24, 1998
  - 242-pin Slot 1 SEPP (Single Edge Processor Package), Socket 370 PPGA package
  - 19 million transistors
  - 66 MHz system bus clock rate
  - Slot 1, Socket 370
  - 32 KB L1 cache
  - 128 KB integrated cache
  - Family 6 model 6
  - Variants
    - 300, 333 MHz introduced August 24, 1998
    - 366, 400 MHz introduced January 4, 1999
    - 433 MHz introduced March 22, 1999
    - 466 MHz
    - 500 MHz introduced August 2, 1999
    - 533 MHz introduced January 4, 2000
    - 266 MHz (Mobile)
    - 300 MHz (Mobile)
    - 333 MHz (Mobile) introduced April 5, 1999
    - 366 MHz (Mobile)
    - 400 MHz (Mobile)
    - 433 MHz (Mobile)
    - 450 MHz (Mobile) introduced February 14, 2000
    - 466 MHz (Mobile)
    - 500 MHz (Mobile) introduced February 14, 2000

Pentium II Xeon (chronological entry)

- Introduced June 29, 1998

==== Pentium III ====
- Katmai – 0.25 μm process technology
  - Introduced February 26, 1999
  - Improved PII (i.e. P6-based core) now including Streaming SIMD Extensions (SSE)
  - 9.5 million transistors
  - 512 KB (512 × 1024 B) 1/2 bandwidth L2 External cache
  - 242-pin Slot 1 SECC2 (Single Edge Contact cartridge 2) processor package
  - System bus clock rate 100 MHz, 133 MHz (B-models)
  - Slot 1
  - Family 6 model 7
  - Variants
    - 450, 500 MHz introduced February 26, 1999
    - 550 MHz introduced May 17, 1999
    - 600 MHz introduced August 2, 1999
    - 533, 600 MHz introduced (133 MHz bus clock rate) September 27, 1999
- Coppermine – 0.18 μm process technology
  - Introduced October 25, 1999
  - 28.1 million transistors
  - 256 KB (512 × 1024 B) Advanced Transfer L2 cache (integrated)
  - 242-pin Slot-1 SECC2 (Single Edge Contact cartridge 2) processor package, 370-pin FC-PGA (flip-chip pin grid array) package
  - System Bus clock rate 100 MHz (E-models), 133 MHz (EB models)
  - Slot 1, Socket 370
  - Family 6 model 8
  - Variants
    - 500 MHz (100 MHz bus clock rate)
    - 533 MHz
    - 550 MHz (100 MHz bus clock rate)
    - 600 MHz
    - 600 MHz (100 MHz bus clock rate)
    - 650 MHz (100 MHz bus clock rate) introduced October 25, 1999
    - 667 MHz introduced October 25, 1999
    - 700 MHz (100 MHz bus clock rate) introduced October 25, 1999
    - 733 MHz introduced October 25, 1999
    - 750, 800 MHz (100 MHz bus clock rate) introduced December 20, 1999
    - 850 MHz (100 MHz bus clock rate) introduced March 20, 2000
    - 866 MHz introduced March 20, 2000
    - 933 MHz introduced May 24, 2000
    - 1000 MHz introduced March 8, 2000 (not widely available at time of release)
    - 1100 MHz
    - 1133 MHz (first version recalled, later re-released)
    - 400, 450, 500 MHz (Mobile) introduced October 25, 1999
    - 600, 650 MHz (Mobile) introduced January 18, 2000
    - 700 MHz (Mobile) introduced April 24, 2000
    - 750 MHz (Mobile) introduced June 19, 2000
    - 800, 850 MHz (Mobile) introduced September 25, 2000
    - 900, 1000 MHz (Mobile) introduced March 19, 2001
- Tualatin – 0.13 μm process technology
  - Introduced July 2001
  - 28.1 million transistors
  - 32 KB (32 × 1024 B) L1 cache
  - 256 KB or 512 KB Advanced Transfer L2 cache (integrated)
  - 370-pin FC-PGA2 (flip-chip pin grid array) package
  - 133 MHz system bus clock rate
  - Socket 370
  - Family 6 model 11
  - Variants
    - 1133 MHz (256 KB L2)
    - 1133 MHz (512 KB L2)
    - 1200 MHz
    - 1266 MHz (512 KB L2)
    - 1333 MHz
    - 1400 MHz (512 KB L2)

==== Pentium II Xeon and Pentium III Xeon ====
- PII Xeon
  - Variants
    - 400 MHz introduced June 29, 1998
    - 450 MHz (512 KB L2 cache) introduced October 6, 1998
    - 450 MHz (1 MB and 2 MB L2 cache) introduced January 5, 1999
- PIII Xeon
  - Introduced October 25, 1999
  - 9.5 million transistors at 0.25 μm or 28 million at 0.18 μm
  - L2 cache is 256 KB, 1 MB, or 2 MB Advanced Transfer Cache (Integrated)
  - Processor Package Style is Single Edge Contact Cartridge (S.E.C.C.2) or SC330
  - System Bus clock rate 133 MHz (256 KB L2 cache) or 100 MHz (1–2 MB L2 cache)
  - System Bus width: 64 bits
  - Addressable memory: 64 GB
  - Used in two-way servers and workstations (256 KB L2) or 4- and 8-way servers (1–2 MB L2)
  - Family 6 model 10
  - Variants
    - 500 MHz (0.25 μm process) introduced March 17, 1999
    - 550 MHz (0.25 μm process) introduced August 23, 1999
    - 600 MHz (0.18 μm process, 256 KB L2 cache) introduced October 25, 1999
    - 667 MHz (0.18 μm process, 256 KB L2 cache) introduced October 25, 1999
    - 733 MHz (0.18 μm process, 256 KB L2 cache) introduced October 25, 1999
    - 800 MHz (0.18 μm process, 256 KB L2 cache) introduced January 12, 2000
    - 866 MHz (0.18 μm process, 256 KB L2 cache) introduced April 10, 2000
    - 933 MHz (0.18 μm process, 256 KB L2 cache)
    - 1000 MHz (0.18 μm process, 256 KB L2 cache) introduced August 22, 2000
    - 700 MHz (0.18 μm process, 1–2 MB L2 cache) introduced May 22, 2000

==== Celeron (Pentium III Coppermine-based) ====
- Coppermine-128, 0.18 μm process technology
  - Introduced March, 2000
  - Streaming SIMD Extensions (SSE)
  - Socket 370, FC-PGA processor package
  - 28.1 million transistors
  - 66 MHz system bus clock rate, 100 MHz system bus clock rate from January 3, 2001
  - 32 KB L1 cache
  - 128 KB Advanced Transfer L2 cache
  - Family 6 model 8
  - Variants
    - 533 MHz
    - 566 MHz
    - 600 MHz
    - 633, 667, 700 MHz introduced June 26, 2000
    - 733, 766 MHz introduced November 13, 2000
    - 800 MHz introduced January 3, 2001
    - 850 MHz introduced April 9, 2001
    - 900 MHz introduced July 2, 2001
    - 950, 1000, 1100 MHz introduced August 31, 2001
    - 550 MHz (Mobile)
    - 600, 650 MHz (Mobile) introduced June 19, 2000
    - 700 MHz (Mobile) introduced September 25, 2000
    - 750 MHz (Mobile) introduced March 19, 2001
    - 800 MHz (Mobile)
    - 850 MHz (Mobile) introduced July 2, 2001
    - 600 MHz (LV Mobile)
    - 500 MHz (ULV Mobile) introduced January 30, 2001
    - 600 MHz (ULV Mobile)

XScale (chronological entry – non-x86 architecture)

- Introduced August 23, 2000

Pentium 4 (not 4EE, 4E, 4F), Itanium, P4-based Xeon, Itanium 2 (chronological entries)

- Introduced April 2000 – July 2002

==== Pentium III Tualatin-based ====
- Tualatin – 0.13 μm process technology
  - 32 KB L1 cache
  - 512 KB Advanced Transfer L2 cache
  - 133 MHz system bus clock rate
  - Socket 370
  - Variants
    - 1.0 GHz
    - 1.13 GHz
    - 1.26 GHz
    - 1.4 GHz

==== Celeron (Pentium III Tualatin-based) ====
- Tualatin Celeron – 0.13 μm process technology
  - 32 KB L1 cache
  - 256 KB Advanced Transfer L2 cache
  - 100 MHz system bus clock rate
  - Socket 370
  - Family 6 model 11
  - Variants
    - 1.0 GHz
    - 1.1 GHz
    - 1.2 GHz
    - 1.3 GHz
    - 1.4 GHz

==== Pentium M ====
- Banias 0.13 μm process technology
  - Introduced March 2003
  - 64 KB L1 cache
  - 1 MB L2 cache (integrated)
  - Based on Pentium III core, with SSE2 SIMD instructions and deeper pipeline
  - 77 million transistors
  - Micro-FCPGA, Micro-FCBGA processor package
  - Heart of the Intel mobile Centrino system
  - 400 MHz NetBurst-style system bus
  - Family 6 model 9
  - Variants
    - 900 MHz (ultra-low voltage)
    - 1.0 GHz (ultra-low voltage)
    - 1.1 GHz (low voltage)
    - 1.2 GHz (low voltage)
    - 1.3 GHz
    - 1.4 GHz
    - 1.5 GHz
    - 1.6 GHz
    - 1.7 GHz
- Dothan 0.09 μm (90 nm) process technology
  - Introduced May 2004
  - 2 MB L2 cache
  - 140 million transistors
  - Revised data prefetch unit
  - 400 MHz NetBurst-style system bus
  - 21 W TDP
  - Family 6 model 13
  - Variants
    - 1.00 GHz (Pentium M 723) (ultra-low voltage, 5 W TDP)
    - 1.10 GHz (Pentium M 733) (ultra-low voltage, 5 W TDP)
    - 1.20 GHz (Pentium M 753) (ultra-low voltage, 5 W TDP)
    - 1.30 GHz (Pentium M 718) (low voltage, 10 W TDP)
    - 1.40 GHz (Pentium M 738) (low voltage, 10 W TDP)
    - 1.50 GHz (Pentium M 758) (low voltage, 10 W TDP)
    - 1.60 GHz (Pentium M 778) (low voltage, 10 W TDP)
    - 1.40 GHz (Pentium M 710)
    - 1.50 GHz (Pentium M 715)
    - 1.60 GHz (Pentium M 725)
    - 1.70 GHz (Pentium M 735)
    - 1.80 GHz (Pentium M 745)
    - 2.00 GHz (Pentium M 755)
    - 2.10 GHz (Pentium M 765)
- Dothan 533 0.09 μm (90 nm) process technology
  - Introduced Q1 2005
  - Same as Dothan except with a 533 MHz NetBurst-style system bus and 27 W TDP
  - Variants
    - 1.60 GHz (Pentium M 730)
    - 1.73 GHz (Pentium M 740)
    - 1.86 GHz (Pentium M 750)
    - 2.00 GHz (Pentium M 760)
    - 2.13 GHz (Pentium M 770)
    - 2.26 GHz (Pentium M 780)
- Stealey 0.09 μm (90 nm) process technology
  - Introduced Q2 2007
  - 512 KB L2, 3 W TDP
  - Variants
    - 600 MHz (A100)
    - 800 MHz (A110)

==== Celeron M ====
- Banias-512 0.13 μm process technology
  - Introduced March 2003
  - 64 KB L1 cache
  - 512 KB L2 cache (integrated)
  - SSE2 SIMD instructions
  - No SpeedStep technology, is not part of the 'Centrino' package
  - Family 6 model 9
  - Variants
    - 310, 1.20 GHz
    - 320, 1.30 GHz
    - 330, 1.40 GHz
    - 340, 1.50 GHz
- Dothan-1024 90 nm process technology
  - 64 KB L1 cache
  - 1 MB L2 cache (integrated)
  - SSE2 SIMD instructions
  - No SpeedStep technology, is not part of the 'Centrino' package
  - Variants
    - 350, 1.30 GHz
    - 350J, 1.30 GHz, with Execute Disable bit
    - 360, 1.40 GHz
    - 360J, 1.40 GHz, with Execute Disable bit
    - 370, 1.50 GHz, with Execute Disable bit
      - Family 6, Model 13, Stepping 8
    - 380, 1.60 GHz, with Execute Disable bit
    - 390, 1.70 GHz, with Execute Disable bit
- Yonah-1024 65 nm process technology
  - 64 KB L1 cache
  - 1 MB L2 cache (integrated)
  - SSE3 SIMD instructions, 533 MHz front-side bus, execute-disable bit
  - No SpeedStep technology, is not part of the 'Centrino' package
  - Variants
    - 410, 1.46 GHz
    - 420, 1.60 GHz,
    - 423, 1.06 GHz (ultra-low voltage)
    - 430, 1.73 GHz
    - 440, 1.86 GHz
    - 443, 1.20 GHz (ultra-low voltage)
    - 450, 2.00 GHz

==== Intel Core ====
- Yonah 0.065 μm (65 nm) process technology
  - Introduced January 2006
  - 533/667 MHz front-side bus
  - 2 MB (Shared on Duo) L2 cache
  - SSE3 SIMD instructions
  - 31W TDP (T versions)
  - Family 6, Model 14
  - Variants:
    - Intel Core Duo T2700 2.33 GHz
    - Intel Core Duo T2600 2.16 GHz
    - Intel Core Duo T2500 2 GHz
    - Intel Core Duo T2450 2 GHz
    - Intel Core Duo T2400 1.83 GHz
    - Intel Core Duo T2300 1.66 GHz
    - Intel Core Duo T2050 1.6 GHz
    - Intel Core Duo T2300e 1.66 GHz
    - Intel Core Duo T2080 1.73 GHz
    - Intel Core Duo L2500 1.83 GHz (low voltage, 15 W TDP)
    - Intel Core Duo L2400 1.66 GHz (low voltage, 15 W TDP)
    - Intel Core Duo L2300 1.5 GHz (low voltage, 15 W TDP)
    - Intel Core Duo U2500 1.2 GHz (ultra-low voltage, 9 W TDP)
    - Intel Core Solo T1350 1.86 GHz (533 FSB)
    - Intel Core Solo T1300 1.66 GHz
    - Intel Core Solo T1200 1.5 GHz

==== Dual-Core Xeon LV ====
- Sossaman 0.065 μm (65 nm) process technology
  - Introduced March 2006
  - Based on Yonah core, with SSE3 SIMD instructions
  - 667 MHz frontside bus
  - 2 MB shared L2 cache
  - Variants
    - 2.0 GHz

=== 32-bit processors: NetBurst microarchitecture ===
==== Pentium 4 ====
- 0.18 μm process technology (1.40 and 1.50 GHz)
  - Introduced November 20, 2000
  - L2 cache was 256 KB Advanced Transfer cache (integrated)
  - Processor package Style was PGA423, PGA478
  - System bus clock rate 400 MHz
  - SSE2 SIMD Extensions
  - 42 million transistors
  - Used in desktops and entry-level workstations
- 0.18 μm process technology (1.7 GHz)
  - Introduced April 23, 2001
  - See the 1.4 and 1.5 chips for details
- 0.18 μm process technology (1.6 and 1.8 GHz)
  - Introduced July 2, 2001
  - See 1.4 and 1.5 chips for details
  - Core voltage is 1.15 volts in Maximum Performance Mode; 1.05 volts in battery optimized mode
  - Power <1 watt in battery optimized mode
  - Used in full-size and then light mobile PCs
- 0.18 μm process technology Willamette (1.9 and 2.0 GHz)
  - Introduced August 27, 2001
  - See 1.4 and 1.5 chips for details
- Family 15 model 1
- Pentium 4 (2 GHz, 2.20 GHz)
  - Introduced January 7, 2002
- Pentium 4 (2.4 GHz)
  - Introduced April 2, 2002
- 0.13 μm process technology Northwood A (1.7, 1.8, 1.9, 2, 2.2, 2.4, 2.5, 2.6, 2.8 (OEM), 3.0 (OEM) GHz)
  - Improved branch prediction and other microcodes tweaks
  - 512 KB integrated L2 cache
  - 55 million transistors
  - 400 MHz system bus
- Family 15 model 2
- 0.13 μm process technology Northwood B (2.26, 2.4, 2.53, 2.66, 2.8, 3.06 GHz)
  - 533 MHz system bus. (3.06 includes Intel's Hyper-Threading technology)
- 0.13 μm process technology Northwood C (2.4, 2.6, 2.8, 3.0, 3.2, 3.4 GHz)
  - 800 MHz system bus (all versions include Hyper-Threading)
  - 6500 to 10,000 MIPS

Itanium (chronological entry – new non-x86 architecture)

- Introduced 2001

==== Xeon (32-bit NetBurst) ====
- Official designation now Xeon; i.e. not "Pentium 4 Xeon"
- Xeon 1.4, 1.5, 1.7 GHz
  - Introduced May 21, 2001
  - L2 cache was 256 KB Advanced Transfer cache (integrated)
  - Processor package Organic Land Grid Array 603 (OLGA 603)
  - System bus clock rate 400 MHz
  - SSE2 SIMD Extensions
  - Used in high-performance and mid-range dual processor enabled workstations
- Xeon 2.0 GHz and up to 3.6 GHz
  - Introduced September 25, 2001

Itanium 2 (chronological entry – new non-x86 architecture)

- Introduced July 2002
- See main entry

==== Mobile Pentium 4-M ====
- 0.13 μm process technology
- 55 million transistors
- 512 KB L2 cache
- BUS a 400 MHz
- Supports up to 1 GB of DDR 266 MHz memory
- Supports ACPI 2.0 and APM 1.2 System Power Management
- 1.3–1.2 V (SpeedStep)
- Power: 1.2 GHz 20.8 W, 1.6 GHz 30 W, 2.6 GHz 35 W
- Sleep power 5 W (1.2 V)
- Deeper sleep power 2.9 W (1.0 V)
  - 1.40 GHz – 23 April 2002
  - 1.50 GHz – 23 April 2002
  - 1.60 GHz – 4 March 2002
  - 1.70 GHz – 4 March 2002
  - 1.80 GHz – 23 April 2002
  - 1.90 GHz – 24 June 2002
  - 2.00 GHz – 24 June 2002
  - 2.20 GHz – 16 September 2002
  - 2.40 GHz – 14 January 2003
  - 2.50 GHz – 16 April 2003
  - 2.60 GHz – 11 June 2003

==== Pentium 4 EE ====
- Introduced September 2003
- "Extreme Edition"
- Built from the Xeon's "Gallatin" core, but with 2 MB cache

==== Pentium 4E ====
- Introduced February 2004
- Built on 0.09 μm (90 nm) process technology Prescott (2.4 A, 2.8, 2.8 A, 3.0, 3.2, 3.4, 3.6, 3.8) 1 MB L2 cache
- 533 MHz system bus (2.4A and 2.8A only)
- 800 MHz system bus (all other models)
- 125 million transistors in 1 MB models
- 169 million transistors in 2 MB models
- Hyper-Threading support is only available on CPUs using the 800 MHz system bus.
- The processor's integer instruction pipeline has been increased from 20 stages to 31 stages, which theoretically allows for even greater bandwidth
- 7500 to 11,000 MIPS
- LGA 775 versions are in the 5xx series (32-bit) and 5x1 series (with Intel 64)
- The 6xx series has 2 MB L2 cache and Intel 64

=== 64-bit processors: IA-64 ===
- New instruction set, not at all related to x86
- Before the feature was eliminated (Montecito, July 2006) IA-64 processors supported 32-bit x86 in hardware, but slowly (see its 2001 market reception and 2006 architectural changes)

==== Itanium ====
- Code name Merced
- Family 7
- Released May 29, 2001
- 733 MHz and 800 MHz
- 2 MB cache
- All recalled and replaced by Itanium 2

==== Itanium 2 ====
- Family 0x1F
- Released July 2002
- 900 MHz – 1.6 GHz
- McKinley 900 MHz 1.5 MB cache, Model 0x0
- McKinley 1 GHz, 3 MB cache, Model 0x0
- Deerfield 1 GHz, 1.5 MB cache, Model 0x1
- Madison 1.3 GHz, 3 MB cache, Model 0x1
- Madison 1.4 GHz, 4 MB cache, Model 0x1
- Madison 1.5 GHz, 6 MB cache, Model 0x1
- Madison 1.67 GHz, 9 MB cache, Model 0x1
- Hondo 1.4 GHz, 4 MB cache, dual-core MCM, Model 0x1

=== 64-bit processors: Intel 64 – NetBurst microarchitecture ===
- Intel Extended Memory 64 Technology
- Mostly compatible with AMD's AMD64 architecture
- Introduced Spring 2004, with the Pentium 4F (D0 and later P4 steppings)

==== Pentium 4F ====
- Prescott-2M built on 0.09 μm (90 nm) process technology
- 2.8–3.8 GHz (model numbers 6x0)
- Introduced February 20, 2005
- Same features as Prescott with the addition of:
  - 2 MB cache
  - Intel 64-bit
  - Enhanced Intel SpeedStep Technology (EIST)
- Cedar Mill built on 0.065 μm (65 nm) process technology
- 3.0–3.6 GHz (model numbers 6x1)
- Introduced January 16, 2006
- Die shrink of Prescott-2M
- Same features as Prescott-2M
- Family 15 Model 4

==== Pentium D ====
- Dual-core microprocessor
- No Hyper-Threading
- 800 (4×200) MHz front-side bus
- LGA 775 (Socket T)
- Smithfield (Pentium D) – 90 nm process technology (2.66–3.2 GHz)
  - Introduced May 26, 2005
  - 2.66–3.2 GHz (model numbers 805–840)
  - 230 million transistors
  - 1 MB × 2 (non-shared, 2 MB total) L2 cache
  - Cache coherency between cores requires communication over the FSB
  - Performance increase of 60% over similarly clocked Prescott
  - 2.66 GHz (533 MHz FSB) Pentium D 805 introduced December 2005
  - Contains 2× Prescott dies in one package
  - Family 15 Model 4
- Presler (Pentium D) – 65 nm process technology (2.8–3.6 GHz)
  - Introduced January 16, 2006
  - 2.8–3.6 GHz (model numbers 915–960)
  - 376 million transistors
  - 2× 2 MB (non-shared, 4 MB total) L2 cache
  - Contains 2× Cedar Mill dies in one package
  - Variants
    - Pentium D 945

==== Pentium Extreme Edition ====
- Dual-core microprocessor
- Enabled Hyper-Threading
- 800 (4×200) MHz front-side bus
- Smithfield (Pentium Extreme Edition) – 90 nm process technology (3.2 GHz)
  - Variants
    - Pentium 840 EE – 3.20 GHz (2 × 1 MB L2)
- Presler (Pentium Extreme Edition) – 65 nm process technology (3.46, 3.73)
  - 2 MB × 2 (non-shared, 4 MB total) L2 cache
  - Variants
    - Pentium 955 EE – 3.46 GHz, 1066 MHz front-side bus
    - Pentium 965 EE – 3.73 GHz, 1066 MHz front-side bus

==== Xeon (64-bit NetBurst) ====
- Nocona
  - Introduced 2004
- Irwindale
  - Introduced 2004
- Cranford
  - Introduced April 2005
  - MP version of Nocona
- Potomac
  - Introduced April 2005
  - Cranford with 8 MB of L3 cache
- Paxville DP (2.8 GHz)
  - Introduced October 10, 2005
  - Dual-core version of Irwindale, with 4 MB of L2 cache (2 MB per core)
  - 2.8 GHz
  - 800 MT/s front-side bus
- Paxville MP – 90 nm process (2.67 – 3.0 GHz)
  - Introduced November 1, 2005
  - Dual-core Xeon 7000 series
  - MP-capable version of Paxville DP
  - 2 MB of L2 cache (1 MB per core) or 4 MB of L2 (2 MB per core)
  - 667 MT/s FSB or 800 MT/s FSB
- Dempsey – 65 nm process (2.67–3.73 GHz)
  - Introduced May 23, 2006
  - Dual-core Xeon 5000 series
  - MP version of Presler
  - 667 MT/s or 1066 MT/s FSB
  - 4 MB of L2 cache (2 MB per core)
  - LGA 771 (Socket J).
- Tulsa – 65 nm process (2.5–3.4 GHz)
  - Introduced August 29, 2006
  - Dual-core Xeon 7100-series
  - Improved version of Paxville MP
  - 667 MT/s or 800 MT/s FSB

=== 64-bit processors: Intel 64 – Core microarchitecture ===
==== Xeon (64-bit Core microarchitecture) ====
- Woodcrest – 65 nm process technology
  - Server and Workstation CPU (SMP support for dual CPU system)
  - Introduced June 26, 2006
  - Intel VT-x, multiple OS support
  - EIST (Enhanced Intel SpeedStep Technology) in 5140, 5148LV, 5150, 5160
  - Execute Disable Bit
  - TXT, enhanced security hardware extensions
  - SSSE3 SIMD instructions
  - iAMT2 (Intel Active Management Technology), remotely manage computers
  - Variants
    - Xeon 5160, 3.00 GHz (4 MB L2, 1333 MHz FSB, 80 W)
    - Xeon 5150, 2.66 GHz (4 MB L2, 1333 MHz FSB, 65 W)
    - Xeon 5140, 2.33 GHz (4 MB L2, 1333 MHz FSB, 65 W)
    - Xeon 5130, 2.00 GHz (4 MB L2, 1333 MHz FSB, 65 W)
    - Xeon 5120, 1.86 GHz (4 MB L2, 1066 MHz FSB, 65 W)
    - Xeon 5110, 1.60 GHz (4 MB L2, 1066 MHz FSB, 65 W)
    - Xeon 5148LV, 2.33 GHz (4 MB L2, 1333 MHz FSB, 40 W) (low voltage edition)
- Clovertown – 65 nm process technology
  - Server and Workstation CPU (SMP support for dual CPU system)
  - Introduced December 13, 2006
  - Quad-core
  - Intel VT-x, multiple OS support
  - EIST (Enhanced Intel SpeedStep Technology) in E5365, L5335
  - Execute Disable Bit
  - TXT, enhanced security hardware extensions
  - SSSE3 SIMD instructions
  - iAMT2 (Intel Active Management Technology), remotely manage computers
  - Variants
    - Xeon X5355, 2.66 GHz (2×4 MB L2, 1333 MHz FSB, 105 W)
    - Xeon E5345, 2.33 GHz (2×4 MB L2, 1333 MHz FSB, 80 W)
    - Xeon E5335, 2.00 GHz (2×4 MB L2, 1333 MHz FSB, 80 W)
    - Xeon E5320, 1.86 GHz (2×4 MB L2, 1066 MHz FSB, 65 W)
    - Xeon E5310, 1.60 GHz (2×4 MB L2, 1066 MHz FSB, 65 W)
    - Xeon L5320, 1.86 GHz (2×4 MB L2, 1066 MHz FSB, 50 W) (low voltage edition)

==== Intel Core 2 ====
- Conroe – 65 nm process technology
  - Desktop CPU (SMP support restricted to 2 CPUs)
  - Two cores on one die
  - Introduced July 27, 2006
  - SSSE3 SIMD instructions
  - 291 million transistors
  - 64 KB of L1 cache per core (32+32 KB 8-way)
  - Intel VT-x, multiple OS support
  - TXT, enhanced security hardware extensions
  - Execute Disable Bit
  - EIST (Enhanced Intel SpeedStep Technology)
  - iAMT2 (Intel Active Management Technology), remotely manage computers
  - Intel Management Engine introduced
  - LGA 775
  - Variants
    - Core 2 Duo E6850, 3.00 GHz (4 MB L2, 1333 MHz FSB)
    - Core 2 Duo E6800, 2.93 GHz (4 MB L2, 1066 MHz FSB)
    - Core 2 Duo E6750, 2.67 GHz (4 MB L2, 1333 MHz FSB, 65 W)
    - Core 2 Duo E6700, 2.67 GHz (4 MB L2, 1066 MHz FSB)
    - Core 2 Duo E6600, 2.40 GHz (4 MB L2, 1066 MHz FSB, 65 W)
    - Core 2 Duo E6550, 2.33 GHz (4 MB L2, 1333 MHz FSB)
    - Core 2 Duo E6420, 2.13 GHz (4 MB L2, 1066 MHz FSB)
    - Core 2 Duo E6400, 2.13 GHz (2 MB L2, 1066 MHz FSB)
    - Core 2 Duo E6320, 1.86 GHz (4 MB L2, 1066 MHz FSB) Family 6, Model 15, Stepping 6
    - Core 2 Duo E6300, 1.86 GHz (2 MB L2, 1066 MHz FSB)
- Conroe XE – 65 nm process technology
  - Desktop Extreme Edition CPU (SMP support restricted to 2 CPUs)
  - Introduced July 27, 2006
  - Same features as Conroe
  - LGA 775
  - Variants
    - Core 2 Extreme X6800 – 2.93 GHz (4 MB L2, 1066 MHz FSB)
- Allendale (Intel Core 2) – 65 nm process technology
  - Desktop CPU (SMP support restricted to 2 CPUs)
  - Two CPUs on one die
  - Introduced January 21, 2007
  - SSSE3 SIMD instructions
  - 167 million transistors
  - TXT, enhanced security hardware extensions
  - Execute Disable Bit
  - EIST (Enhanced Intel SpeedStep Technology)
  - iAMT2 (Intel Active Management Technology), remotely manage computers
  - LGA 775
  - Variants
    - Core 2 Duo E4700, 2.60 GHz (2 MB L2, 800 MHz FSB)
    - Core 2 Duo E4600, 2.40 GHz (2 MB L2, 800 MHz FSB)
    - Core 2 Duo E4500, 2.20 GHz (2 MB L2, 800 MHz FSB)
    - Core 2 Duo E4400, 2.00 GHz (2 MB L2, 800 MHz FSB)
    - Core 2 Duo E4300, 1.80 GHz (2 MB L2, 800 MHz FSB) Family 6, Model 15, Stepping 2
- Merom – 65 nm process technology
  - Mobile CPU (SMP support restricted to 2 CPUs)
  - Introduced July 27, 2006
  - Family 6, Model 15
  - Same features as Conroe
  - Socket M / Socket P / 479-ball Micro-FCBGA
  - Variants
    - Core 2 Extreme X7900 2.80 GHz (4 MB L2, 800 MHz FSB)
    - Core 2 Extreme X7800 2.60 GHz (4 MB L2, 800 MHz FSB)
    - Core 2 Duo T7800, 2.60 GHz (4 MB L2, 800 MHz FSB) (Santa Rosa platform)
    - Core 2 Duo T7700, 2.40 GHz (4 MB L2, 800 MHz FSB)
    - Core 2 Duo T7600, 2.33 GHz (4 MB L2, 667 MHz FSB)
    - Core 2 Duo T7500, 2.20 GHz (4 MB L2, 800 MHz FSB)
    - Core 2 Duo T7400, 2.16 GHz (4 MB L2, 667 MHz FSB)
    - Core 2 Duo T7300, 2.00 GHz (4 MB L2, 800 MHz FSB)
    - Core 2 Duo T7250, 2.00 GHz (2 MB L2, 800 MHz FSB)
    - Core 2 Duo T7200, 2.00 GHz (4 MB L2, 667 MHz FSB)
    - Core 2 Duo T7100, 1.80 GHz (2 MB L2, 800 MHz FSB)
    - Core 2 Duo T5600, 1.83 GHz (2 MB L2, 667 MHz FSB) Family 6, Model 15, Stepping 6
    - Core 2 Duo T5550, 1.83 GHz (2 MB L2, 667 MHz FSB, no VT)
    - Core 2 Duo T5500, 1.66 GHz (2 MB L2, 667 MHz FSB, no VT)
    - Core 2 Duo T5470, 1.60 GHz (2 MB L2, 800 MHz FSB, no VT) Family 6, Model 15, Stepping 13
    - Core 2 Duo T5450, 1.66 GHz (2 MB L2, 667 MHz FSB, no VT)
    - Core 2 Duo T5300, 1.73 GHz (2 MB L2, 533 MHz FSB, no VT)
    - Core 2 Duo T5270, 1.40 GHz (2 MB L2, 800 MHz FSB, no VT)
    - Core 2 Duo T5250, 1.50 GHz (2 MB L2, 667 MHz FSB, no VT)
    - Core 2 Duo T5200, 1.60 GHz (2 MB L2, 533 MHz FSB, no VT)
    - Core 2 Duo L7700, 1.80 GHz (4 MB L2, 800 MHz FSB) (low voltage) Family 6, Model 15, Stepping 11
    - Core 2 Duo L7500, 1.60 GHz (4 MB L2, 800 MHz FSB) (low voltage)
    - Core 2 Duo L7400, 1.50 GHz (4 MB L2, 667 MHz FSB) (low voltage)
    - Core 2 Duo L7300, 1.40 GHz (4 MB L2, 800 MHz FSB) (low voltage)
    - Core 2 Duo L7200, 1.33 GHz (4 MB L2, 667 MHz FSB) (low voltage)
    - Core 2 Duo U7700, 1.33 GHz (2 MB L2, 533 MHz FSB) (ultra low voltage)
    - Core 2 Duo U7600, 1.20 GHz (2 MB L2, 533 MHz FSB) (ultra low voltage)
    - Core 2 Duo U7500, 1.06 GHz (2 MB L2, 533 MHz FSB) (ultra low voltage)
    - Core 2 Duo U7100, 1.20 GHz (4 MB L2, 800 MHz FSB) (ultra low voltage) Family 6, Model 15, Stepping 11
    - Core 2 Solo U2100, 1.06 GHz (1 MB L2, 533 MHz FSB) (ultra low voltage)
    - Core 2 Solo U2200, 1.20 GHz (1 MB L2, 533 MHz FSB) (ultra low voltage)
- Kentsfield – 65 nm process technology
  - Two dual-core CPU dies in one package
  - Desktop CPU quad-core (SMP support restricted to 4 CPUs)
  - Introduced December 13, 2006
  - Same features as Conroe but with 4 CPU cores
  - 586 million transistors
  - LGA 775
  - Family 6, Model 15, Stepping 11
  - Variants
    - Core 2 Extreme QX6850, 3 GHz (2×4 MB L2 cache, 1333 MHz FSB)
    - Core 2 Extreme QX6800, 2.93 GHz (2×4 MB L2 cache, 1066 MHz FSB) (April 9, 2007)
    - Core 2 Extreme QX6700, 2.66 GHz (2×4 MB L2 cache, 1066 MHz FSB) (November 14, 2006)
    - Core 2 Quad Q6700, 2.66 GHz (2×4 MB L2 cache, 1066 MHz FSB) (July 22, 2007)
    - Core 2 Quad Q6600, 2.40 GHz (2×4 MB L2 cache, 1066 MHz FSB) (January 7, 2007)
- Wolfdale – 45 nm process technology
  - Die shrink of Conroe
  - Same features as Conroe with the addition of:
    - 50% more cache, 6 MB as opposed to 4 MB
    - Intel Trusted Execution Technology
    - SSE4 SIMD instructions
  - 410 million transistors
  - Variants
    - Core 2 Duo E8600, 3.33 GHz (6 MB L2, 1333 MHz FSB)
    - Core 2 Duo E8500, 3.16 GHz (6 MB L2, 1333 MHz FSB)
    - Core 2 Duo E8435, 3.07 GHz (6 MB L2, 1066 MHz FSB)
    - Core 2 Duo E8400, 3.00 GHz (6 MB L2, 1333 MHz FSB)
    - Core 2 Duo E8335, 2.93 GHz (6 MB L2, 1066 MHz FSB)
    - Core 2 Duo E8300, 2.83 GHz (6 MB L2, 1333 MHz FSB)
    - Core 2 Duo E8235, 2.80 GHz (6 MB L2, 1066 MHz FSB)
    - Core 2 Duo E8200, 2.66 GHz (6 MB L2, 1333 MHz FSB)
    - Core 2 Duo E8135, 2.66 GHz (6 MB L2, 1066 MHz FSB)
    - Core 2 Duo E8190, 2.66 GHz (6 MB L2, 1333 MHz FSB, no TXT, no VT)
- Wolfdale-3M (Intel Core 2) – 45 nm process technology
  - Intel Trusted Execution Technology
  - Variants
    - Core 2 Duo E7600, 3.06 GHz (3 MB L2, 1066 MHz FSB)
    - Core 2 Duo E7500, 2.93 GHz (3 MB L2, 1066 MHz FSB)
    - Core 2 Duo E7400, 2.80 GHz (3 MB L2, 1066 MHz FSB)
    - Core 2 Duo E7300, 2.66 GHz (3 MB L2, 1066 MHz FSB)
    - Core 2 Duo E7200, 2.53 GHz (3 MB L2, 1066 MHz FSB)
- Yorkfield, 45 nm process technology
  - Quad-core CPU
  - Die shrink of Kentsfield
  - Contains 2× Wolfdale dual-core dies in one package
  - Same features as Wolfdale
  - 820 million transistors
  - Variants
    - Core 2 Extreme QX9770, 3.20 GHz (2×6 MB L2, 1600 MHz FSB)
    - Core 2 Extreme QX9650, 3.00 GHz (2×6 MB L2, 1333 MHz FSB)
    - Core 2 Quad Q9705, 3.16 GHz (2×3 MB L2, 1333 MHz FSB)
    - Core 2 Quad Q9700, 3.16 GHz (2×3 MB L2, 1333 MHz FSB)
    - Core 2 Quad Q9650, 3 GHz (2×6 MB L2, 1333 MHz FSB)
    - Core 2 Quad Q9550, 2.83 GHz (2×6 MB L2, 1333 MHz FSB, 95 W TDP)
    - Core 2 Quad Q9550s, 2.83 GHz (2×6 MB L2, 1333 MHz FSB, 65 W TDP)
    - Core 2 Quad Q9450, 2.66 GHz (2×6 MB L2, 1333 MHz FSB, 95 W TDP)
    - Core 2 Quad Q9505, 2.83 GHz (2×3 MB L2, 1333 MHz FSB, 95 W TDP)
    - Core 2 Quad Q9505s, 2.83 GHz (2×3 MB L2, 1333 MHz FSB, 65 W TDP)
    - Core 2 Quad Q9500, 2.83 GHz (2×3 MB L2, 1333 MHz FSB, 95 W TDP, no TXT)
    - Core 2 Quad Q9400, 2.66 GHz (2×3 MB L2, 1333 MHz FSB, 95 W TDP)
    - Core 2 Quad Q9400s, 2.66 GHz (2×3 MB L2, 1333 MHz FSB, 65 W TDP)
    - Core 2 Quad Q9300, 2.50 GHz (2×3 MB L2, 1333 MHz FSB, 95 W TDP)
    - Core 2 Quad Q8400, 2.66 GHz (2×2 MB L2, 1333 MHz FSB, 95 W TDP)
    - Core 2 Quad Q8400s, 2.66 GHz (2×2 MB L2, 1333 MHz FSB, 65 W TDP)
    - Core 2 Quad Q8300, 2.50 GHz (2×2 MB L2, 1333 MHz FSB, 95 W TDP)
    - Core 2 Quad Q8300s, 2.50 GHz (2×2 MB L2, 1333 MHz FSB, 65 W TDP)
    - Core 2 Quad Q8200, 2.33 GHz (2×2 MB L2, 1333 MHz FSB, 95 W TDP)
    - Core 2 Quad Q8200s, 2.33 GHz (2×2 MB L2, 1333 MHz FSB, 65 W TDP)
    - Core 2 Quad Q7600, 2.70 GHz (2×1 MB L2, 800 MHz FSB, no SSE4) (no Q7600 listed here)
- Intel Core2 Quad Mobile processor family – 45 nm process technology
  - Quad-core CPU
  - Variants
    - Core 2 Quad Q9100, 2.26 GHz (2×6 MB L2, 1066 MHz FSB, 45 W TDP)
    - Core 2 Quad Q9000, 2.00 GHz (2×3 MB L2, 1066 MHz FSB, 45 W TDP)

==== Pentium Dual-Core ====
- Allendale (Pentium Dual-Core) – 65 nm process technology
  - Desktop CPU (SMP support restricted to 2 CPUs)
  - Two cores on one die
  - Introduced January 21, 2007
  - SSSE3 SIMD instructions
  - 167 million transistors
  - TXT, enhanced security hardware extensions
  - Execute Disable Bit
  - EIST (Enhanced Intel SpeedStep Technology)
  - Variants
    - Intel Pentium E2220, 2.40 GHz (1 MB L2, 800 MHz FSB)
    - Intel Pentium E2200, 2.20 GHz (1 MB L2, 800 MHz FSB)
    - Intel Pentium E2180, 2.00 GHz (1 MB L2, 800 MHz FSB)
    - Intel Pentium E2160, 1.80 GHz (1 MB L2, 800 MHz FSB)
    - Intel Pentium E2140, 1.60 GHz (1 MB L2, 800 MHz FSB)
- Wolfdale-3M (Pentium Dual-Core) – 45 nm process technology
  - Intel Pentium E6800, 3.33 GHz (2 MB L2,1066 MHz FSB)
  - Intel Pentium E6700, 3.20 GHz (2 MB L2,1066 MHz FSB)
  - Intel Pentium E6600, 3.06 GHz (2 MB L2,1066 MHz FSB)
  - Intel Pentium E6500, 2.93 GHz (2 MB L2,1066 MHz FSB)
  - Intel Pentium E6300, 2.80 GHz (2 MB L2,1066 MHz FSB)
  - Intel Pentium E5800, 3.20 GHz (2 MB L2, 800 MHz FSB)
  - Intel Pentium E5700, 3.00 GHz (2 MB L2, 800 MHz FSB)
  - Intel Pentium E5500, 2.80 GHz (2 MB L2, 800 MHz FSB)
  - Intel Pentium E5400, 2.70 GHz (2 MB L2, 800 MHz FSB)
  - Intel Pentium E5300, 2.60 GHz (2 MB L2, 800 MHz FSB)
  - Intel Pentium E5200, 2.50 GHz (2 MB L2, 800 MHz FSB)
  - Intel Pentium E2210, 2.20 GHz (1 MB L2, 800 MHz FSB)

==== Celeron (64-bit Core microarchitecture) ====
- Allendale (Celeron, 64-bit Core microarchitecture) – 65 nm process technology
  - Variants
    - Intel Celeron E1600, 2.40 GHz (512 KB L2, 800 MHz FSB)
    - Intel Celeron E1500, 2.20 GHz (512 KB L2, 800 MHz FSB)
    - Intel Celeron E1400, 2.00 GHz (512 KB L2, 800 MHz FSB)
    - Intel Celeron E1200, 1.60 GHz (512 KB L2, 800 MHz FSB)
- Wolfdale-3M (Celeron, 64-bit Core microarchitecture) – 45 nm process technology
  - Variants
    - Intel Celeron E3500, 2.70 GHz (1 MB L2, 800 MHz FSB)
    - Intel Celeron E3400, 2.60 GHz (1 MB L2, 800 MHz FSB)
    - Intel Celeron E3300, 2.50 GHz (1 MB L2, 800 MHz FSB)
    - Intel Celeron E3200, 2.40 GHz (1 MB L2, 800 MHz FSB)
- Conroe-L (Celeron, 64-bit Core microarchitecture) – 65 nm process technology
  - Variants
    - Intel Celeron 450, 2.20 GHz (512 KB L2, 800 MHz FSB)
    - Intel Celeron 440, 2.00 GHz (512 KB L2, 800 MHz FSB)
    - Intel Celeron 430, 1.80 GHz (512 KB L2, 800 MHz FSB)
    - Intel Celeron 420, 1.60 GHz (512 KB L2, 800 MHz FSB)
    - Intel Celeron 220, 1.20 GHz (512 KB L2, 533 MHz FSB)
- Conroe-CL (Celeron, 64-bit Core microarchitecture) – 65 nm process technology
  - LGA 771 package
  - Variants
    - Intel Celeron 445, 1.87 GHz (512 KB L2, 1066 MHz FSB)

==== Celeron M (64-bit Core microarchitecture) ====
- Merom-L 65 nm process technology
  - 64 KB L1 cache
  - 1 MB L2 cache (integrated)
  - SSE3 SIMD instructions, 533 MHz/667 MHz front-side bus, execute-disable bit, 64-bit
  - No SpeedStep technology, is not part of the 'Centrino' package
  - Variants
    - 520, 1.60 GHz
    - 530, 1.73 GHz
    - 540, 1.86 GHz
    - 550, 2.00 GHz
    - 560, 2.13 GHz
    - 570, 2.26 GHz
    - 667 MHz FSB
      - 575, 2.00 GHz
      - 585, 2.16 GHz

=== 64-bit processors: Intel 64 – Nehalem microarchitecture ===
==== Intel Pentium (Nehalem) ====
- Clarkdale (Pentium, Nehalem microarchitecture) – 32 nm process technology (manufacturing 7 Jan 2010)
  - 2 physical cores/2 threads
  - 32+32 KB L1 cache
  - 256 KB L2 cache
  - 3 MB L3 cache
  - Introduced January 2010
  - Socket 1156 LGA
  - 2-channel DDR3
  - Integrated HD GPU
  - Variants
    - G6950, 2.8 GHz (no Hyper-Threading)
    - G6960, 2.933 GHz (no Hyper-Threading)

==== Core i3 (1st generation) ====
- Clarkdale (Core i3 1st generation) – 32 nm process technology
  - 2 physical cores/4 threads
  - 32+32 KB L1 cache
  - 256 KB L2 cache
  - 4 MB L3 cache
  - Introduced on January 7, 2010
  - Socket 1156 LGA
  - 2-channel DDR3
  - Integrated HD GPU
  - Variants
    - 530, 2.93 GHz Hyper-Threading
    - 540, 3.06 GHz Hyper-Threading
    - 550, 3.2 GHz Hyper-Threading
    - 560, 3.33 GHz Hyper-Threading

==== Core i5 (1st generation) ====
- Lynnfield (Core i5 1st generation) – 45 nm process technology
  - 4 physical cores/4 threads
  - 32+32 KB L1 cache
  - 256 KB L2 cache
  - 8 MB L3 cache
  - Introduced September 8, 2009
  - Family 6 Model E (Ext. Model 1E)
  - Socket 1156 LGA
  - 2-channel DDR3
  - Variants
    - 750S, 2.40 GHz/3.20 GHz Turbo Boost
    - 750, 2.66 GHz/3.20 GHz Turbo Boost
    - 760, 2.80 GHz/3.33 GHz Turbo Boost
- Clarkdale (Core i5 1st generation) – 32 nm process technology
  - 2 physical cores/4 threads
  - 32+32 KB L1 cache
  - 256 KB L2 cache
  - 4 MB L3 cache
  - Introduced January, 2010
  - Socket 1156 LGA
  - 2-channel DDR3
  - Integrated HD GPU
  - AES Support
  - Variants
    - 650/655K, 3.2 GHz Hyper-Threading Turbo Boost
    - 660/661, 3.33 GHz Hyper-Threading Turbo Boost
    - 670, 3.46 GHz Hyper-Threading Turbo Boost
    - 680, 3.60 GHz Hyper-Threading Turbo Boost

==== Core i7 (1st generation) ====
- Bloomfield (Core i7 1st generation) – 45 nm process technology
  - 4 physical cores/8 threads
  - 256 KB L2 cache
  - 8 MB L3 cache
  - Front-side bus replaced with QuickPath up to 6.4 GT/s
  - Hyper-Threading is again included. This had previously been removed at the introduction of Core line
  - 781 million transistors
  - Intel Turbo Boost Technology
  - TDP 130 W
  - Introduced November 17, 2008
  - Socket 1366 LGA
  - 3-channel DDR3
  - Variants
    - 975 (extreme edition), 3.33 GHz/3.60 GHz Turbo Boost
    - 965 (extreme edition), 3.20 GHz/3.46 GHz Turbo Boost
    - 960, 3.20 GHz/3.46 GHz Turbo Boost
    - 950, 3.06 GHz/3.33 GHz Turbo Boost
    - 940, 2.93 GHz/3.20 GHz Turbo Boost
    - 930, 2.80 GHz/3.06 GHz Turbo Boost
    - 920, 2.66 GHz/2.93 GHz Turbo Boost
- Lynnfield (Core i7 1st generation) – 45 nm process technology
  - 4 physical cores/8 threads
  - 32+32 KB L1 cache
  - 256 KB L2 cache
  - 8 MB L3 cache
  - No QuickPath, instead compatible with slower DMI interface
  - Hyper-Threading is included
  - Introduced September 8, 2009
  - Socket 1156 LGA
  - 2-channel DDR3
  - Variants
    - 880, 3.06 GHz/3.73 GHz Turbo Boost (TDP 95 W)
    - 870/875K, 2.93 GHz/3.60 GHz Turbo Boost (TDP 95 W)
    - 870S, 2.67 GHz/3.60 GHz Turbo Boost (TDP 82 W)
    - 860, 2.80 GHz/3.46 GHz Turbo Boost (TDP 95 W)
    - 860S, 2.53 GHz/3.46 GHz Turbo Boost (TDP 82 W)

Westmere

- Gulftown, 32 nm process technology
  - 6 physical cores
  - 256 KB L2 cache
  - 12 MB L3 cache
  - Front-side bus replaced with QuickPath up to 6.4 GT/s
  - Hyper-Threading is included
  - Intel Turbo Boost Technology
  - Socket 1366 LGA
  - TDP 130 W
  - Introduced 16 March 2010
  - Variants
    - 990X Extreme Edition, 3.46 GHz/3.73 GHz Turbo Boost
    - 980X Extreme Edition, 3.33 GHz/3.60 GHz Turbo Boost
    - 970, 3.20 GHz/3.46 GHz Turbo Boost
- Clarksfield – Intel Core i7 Mobile processor family – 45 nm process technology
  - 4 physical cores
  - Hyper-Threading is included
  - Intel Turbo Boost Technology
  - Variants
    - 940XM Extreme Edition, 2.13 GHz/3.33 GHz Turbo Boost (8 MB L3, TDP 55 W)
    - 920XM Extreme Edition, 2.00 GHz/3.20 GHz Turbo Boost (8 MB L3, TDP 55 W)
    - 840QM, 1.86 GHz/3.20 GHz Turbo Boost (8 MB L3, TDP 45 W)
    - 820QM, 1.73 GHz/3.06 GHz Turbo Boost (8 MB L3, TDP 45 W)
    - 740QM, 1.73 GHz/2.93 GHz Turbo Boost (6 MB L3, TDP 45 W)
    - 720QM, 1.60 GHz/2.80 GHz Turbo Boost (6 MB L3, TDP 45 W)

==== Xeon (Nehalem microarchitecture) ====
- Gainestown – 45 nm process technology
  - Same processor dies as Bloomfield
  - 256 KB L2 cache
  - 8 MB L3 cache, 4 MB may be disabled
  - QuickPath up to 6.4 GT/s
  - Hyper-Threading is included in some models
  - 781 million transistors
  - Introduced March 29, 2009
  - Variants
    - W5590, X5570, X5560, X5550, E5540, E5530, L5530, E5520, L5520, L5518, 4 cores, 8 MB L3 cache, HT
    - E5506, L5506, E5504, 4 cores, 4 MB L3 cache, no HT
    - L5508, E5502, E5502, 2 cores, 4 MB L3 cache, no HT

=== 64-bit processors: Intel 64 – Sandy Bridge / Ivy Bridge microarchitecture ===
==== Celeron (Sandy Bridge/Ivy Bridge microarchitecture) ====
- Sandy Bridge (Celeron-branded) – 32 nm process technology
  - 2 physical cores/2 threads (500 series), 1 physical core/1 thread (model G440) or 1 physical core/2 threads (models G460 & G465)
  - 2 MB L3 cache (500 series), 1 MB (model G440) or 1.5 MB (models G460 & G465)
  - Introduced 3rd quarter, 2011
  - Socket 1155 LGA
  - 2-channel DDR3-1066
  - 400 series has max TDP of 35 W
  - 500-series variants ending in 'T' have a peak TDP of 35 W; others, 65 W
  - Integrated GPU
    - All variants have peak GPU turbo frequencies of 1 GHz
    - Variants in the 400 series have GPUs running at a base frequency of 650 MHz
    - Variants in the 500 series ending in 'T' have GPUs running at a base frequency of 650 MHz; others at 850 MHz
    - All variants have 6 GPU execution units
  - Variants
    - G440, 1.6 GHz
    - G460, 1.8 GHz
    - G465, 1.9 GHz
    - G470, 2.0 GHz
    - G530T, 2.0 GHz
    - G540T, 2.1 GHz
    - G550T, 2.2 GHz
    - G530, 2.4 GHz
    - G540, 2.5 GHz
    - G550, 2.6 GHz
    - G555, 2.7 GHz

==== Pentium (Sandy Bridge/Ivy Bridge microarchitecture) ====
- Sandy Bridge (Pentium-branded) – 32 nm process technology
  - 2 physical cores/2 threads
  - 3 MB L3 cache
  - 624 million transistors
  - Introduced May, 2011
  - Socket 1155 LGA
  - 2-channel DDR3-1333 (800 series) or DDR3-1066 (600 series)
  - Variants ending in 'T' have a peak TDP of 35 W, others 65 W
  - Integrated GPU (HD 2000)
    - All variants have peak GPU turbo frequencies of 1.1 GHz
    - Variants ending in 'T' have GPUs running at a base frequency of 650 MHz; others at 850 MHz
    - All variants have 6 GPU execution units
  - Variants
    - G620T, 2.2 GHz
    - G630T, 2.3 GHz
    - G640T, 2.4 GHz
    - G645T, 2.5 GHz
    - G860T, 2.6 GHz
    - G620, 2.6 GHz
    - G622, 2.6 GHz
    - G630, 2.7 GHz
    - G632, 2.7 GHz
    - G640, 2.8 GHz
    - G840, 2.8 GHz
    - G645, 2.9 GHz
    - G850, 2.9 GHz
    - G860, 3.0 GHz
    - G870, 3.1 GHz
- Ivy Bridge (Pentium-branded) – 22 nm tri-gate transistor process technology
  - 2 physical cores/2 threads
  - 32+32 KB (per core) L1 cache
  - 256 KB (per core) L2 cache
  - 3 MB L3 cache
  - Introduced September, 2012
  - Socket 1155 LGA
  - 2-channel DDR3-1333 for G2000 series
  - 2-channel DDR3-1600 for G2100 series
  - All variants have GPU base frequencies of 650 MHz and peak GPU turbo frequencies of 1.05 GHz
  - Variants ending in 'T' have a peak TDP of 35 W; others, TDP of 55 W
  - Variants
    - G2020T, 2.5 GHz
    - G2030T, 2.6 GHz
    - G2100T, 2.6 GHz
    - G2120T, 2.7 GHz
    - G2010, 2.8 GHz
    - G2020, 2.9 GHz
    - G2030, 3.0 GHz
    - G2120, 3.1 GHz
    - G2130, 3.2 GHz
    - G2140, 3.3 GHz

==== Core i3 (2nd and 3rd generation) ====
- Sandy Bridge (Core i3 2nd generation) – 32 nm process technology
  - 2 physical cores/4 threads
  - 32+32 KB (per core) L1 cache
  - 256 KB (per core) L2 cache
  - 3 MB L3 cache
  - 624 million transistors
  - Introduced January, 2011
  - Socket 1155 LGA
  - 2-channel DDR3-1333
  - Variants ending in 'T' have a peak TDP of 35 W, others 65 W
  - Integrated GPU
    - All variants have peak GPU turbo frequencies of 1.1 GHz
    - Variants ending in 'T' have GPUs running at a base frequency of 650 MHz; others at 850 MHz
    - Variants ending in '5' have Intel HD Graphics 3000 (12 execution units); others have Intel HD Graphics 2000 (6 execution units)
  - Variants
    - i3-2100T, 2.5 GHz
    - i3-2120T, 2.6 GHz
    - i3-2100, 3.1 GHz
    - i3-2102, 3.1 GHz
    - i3-2105, 3.1 GHz
    - i3-2120, 3.3 GHz
    - i3-2125, 3.3 GHz
    - i3-2130, 3.4 GHz
- Ivy Bridge (Core i3 3rd generation) – 22 nm tri-gate transistor process technology
  - 2 physical cores/4 threads
  - 32+32 KB (per core) L1 cache
  - 256 KB (per core) L2 cache
  - 3 MB L3 cache
  - Introduced September, 2012
  - Socket 1155 LGA
  - 2-channel DDR3-1600
  - Variants ending in '5' have Intel HD Graphics 4000; others have Intel HD Graphics 2500
  - All variants have GPU base frequencies of 650 MHz and peak GPU turbo frequencies of 1.05 GHz
  - TDP 55 W
  - Variants
    - i3-3220T, 2.8 GHz
    - i3-3240T, 2.9 GHz
    - i3-3210, 3.2 GHz
    - i3-3220, 3.3 GHz
    - i3-3225, 3.3 GHz
    - i3-3240, 3.4 GHz
    - i3-3250, 3.5 GHz

==== Core i5 (2nd and 3rd generation) ====
- Sandy Bridge (Core i5 2nd generation) – 32 nm process technology
  - 4 physical cores/4 threads (except for i5-2390T which has 2 physical cores/4 threads)
  - 32+32 KB (per core) L1 cache
  - 256 KB (per core) L2 cache
  - 6 MB L3 cache (except for i5-2390T which has 3 MB)
  - 995 million transistors
  - Introduced January, 2011
  - Socket 1155 LGA
  - 2-channel DDR3-1333
  - Variants ending in 'S' have a peak TDP of 65 W; others, 95 W except where noted
  - Variants ending in 'K' have unlocked multipliers; others cannot be overclocked
  - Integrated GPU
    - i5-2500T has a peak GPU turbo frequency of 1.25 GHz, others 1.1 GHz
    - Variants ending in 'T' have GPUs running at a base frequency of 650 MHz; others at 850 MHz
    - Variants ending in '5' or 'K' have Intel HD Graphics 3000 (12 execution units), except i5-2550K which has no GPU; others have Intel HD Graphics 2000 (6 execution units)
    - Variants ending in 'P' and the i5-2550K have no GPU
  - Variants
    - i5-2390T, 2.7 GHz/3.5 GHz Turbo Boost (35 W max. TDP)
    - i5-2500T, 2.3 GHz/3.3 GHz Turbo Boost (45 W max. TDP)
    - i5-2400S, 2.5 GHz/3.3 GHz Turbo Boost
    - i5-2405S, 2.5 GHz/3.3 GHz Turbo Boost
    - i5-2500S, 2.7 GHz/3.7 GHz Turbo Boost
    - i5-2300, 2.8 GHz/3.1 GHz Turbo Boost
    - i5-2310, 2.9 GHz/3.2 GHz Turbo Boost
    - i5-2320, 3.0 GHz/3.3 GHz Turbo Boost
    - i5-2380P, 3.1 GHz/3.4 GHz Turbo Boost
    - i5-2400, 3.1 GHz/3.4 GHz Turbo Boost
    - i5-2450P, 3.2 GHz/3.5 GHz Turbo Boost
    - i5-2500, 3.3 GHz/3.7 GHz Turbo Boost
    - i5-2500K, 3.3 GHz/3.7 GHz Turbo Boost
    - i5-2550K, 3.4 GHz/3.8 GHz Turbo Boost
- Ivy Bridge (Core i5 3rd generation) – 22 nm Tri-gate transistor process technology
  - 4 physical cores/4 threads (except for i5-3470T which has 2 physical cores/4 threads)
  - 32+32 KB (per core) L1 cache
  - 256 KB (per core) L2 cache
  - 6 MB L3 cache (except for i5-3470T which has 3 MB)
  - Introduced April, 2012
  - Socket 1155 LGA
  - 2-channel DDR3-1600
  - Variants ending in 'S' have a peak TDP of 65 W, Variants ending in 'T' have a peak TDP of 35 or 45 W (see variants); others, 77 W except where noted
  - Variants ending in 'K' have unlocked multipliers; others cannot be overclocked
  - Variants ending in 'P' have no integrated GPU; others have Intel HD Graphics 2500 or Intel HD Graphics 4000 (i5-3475S and i5-3570K only)
  - Variants
    - i5-3470T, 2.9 GHz/3.6 GHz max Turbo Boost (35 W TDP)
    - i5-3570T, 2.3 GHz/3.3 GHz max Turbo Boost (45 W TDP)
    - i5-3330S, 2.7 GHz/3.2 GHz max Turbo Boost
    - i5-3450S, 2.8 GHz/3.5 GHz max Turbo Boost
    - i5-3470S, 2.9 GHz/3.6 GHz max Turbo Boost
    - i5-3475S, 2.9 GHz/3.6 GHz max Turbo Boost
    - i5-3550S, 3.0 GHz/3.7 GHz max Turbo Boost
    - i5-3570S, 3.1 GHz/3.8 GHz max Turbo Boost
    - i5-3330, 3.0 GHz/3.2 GHz max Turbo Boost
    - i5-3350P, 3.1 GHz/3.3 GHz max Turbo Boost (69 W TDP)
    - i5-3450, 3.1 GHz/3.5 GHz max Turbo Boost
    - i5-3470, 3.2 GHz/3.6 GHz max Turbo Boost
    - i5-3550, 3.3 GHz/3.7 GHz max Turbo Boost
    - i5-3570, 3.4 GHz/3.8 GHz max Turbo Boost
    - i5-3570K, 3.4 GHz/3.8 GHz max Turbo Boost

==== Core i7 (2nd and 3rd generation) ====
- Sandy Bridge (Core i7 2nd generation) – 32 nm process technology
  - 4 physical cores/8 threads
  - 32+32 KB (per core) L1 cache
  - 256 KB (per core) L2 cache
  - 8 MB L3 cache
  - 995 million transistors
  - Introduced January, 2011
  - Socket 1155 LGA
  - 2-channel DDR3-1333
  - Variants ending in 'S' have a peak TDP of 65 W, others – 95 W
  - Variants ending in 'K' have unlocked multipliers; others cannot be overclocked
  - Integrated GPU
    - All variants have base GPU frequencies of 850 MHz and peak GPU turbo frequencies of 1.35 GHz
    - Variants ending in 'K' have Intel HD Graphics 3000 (12 execution units); others have Intel HD Graphics 2000 (6 execution units)
  - Variants
    - i7-2600S, 2.8 GHz/3.8 GHz Turbo Boost
    - i7-2600, 3.4 GHz/3.8 GHz Turbo Boost
    - i7-2600K, 3.4 GHz/3.8 GHz Turbo Boost
    - i7-2700K, 3.5 GHz/3.9 GHz Turbo Boost
- Sandy Bridge-E (Core i7 3rd generation X-Series) – 32 nm process technology
  - Up to 6 physical cores/12 threads depending on model number
  - 32+32 KB (per core) L1 cache
  - 256 KB (per core) L2 cache
  - Up to 20 MB L3 cache depending on model number
  - 2.27 billion transistors
  - Introduced November, 2011
  - Socket 2011 LGA
  - 4-channel DDR3-1600
  - All variants have a peak TDP of 130 W
  - No integrated GPU
  - Variants (all marketed under "Intel Core X-series processors")
    - i7-3820, 3.6 GHz/3.8 GHz Turbo Boost, 4 cores, 10 MB L3 cache
    - i7-3930K, 3.2 GHz/3.8 GHz Turbo Boost, 6 cores, 12 MB L3 cache
    - i7-3960X, 3.3 GHz/3.9 GHz Turbo Boost, 6 cores, 15 MB L3 cache
    - i7-3970X, 3.5 GHz/4.0 GHz Turbo Boost, 6 cores, 15 MB L3 cache
- Ivy Bridge (Core i7 3rd generation) – 22 nm Tri-gate transistor process technology
  - 4 physical cores/8 threads
  - 32+32 KB (per core) L1 cache
  - 256 KB (per core) L2 cache
  - 8 MB L3 cache
  - Introduced April, 2012
  - Socket 1155 LGA
  - 2-channel DDR3-1600
  - Variants ending in 'S' have a peak TDP of 65 W, variants ending in 'T' have a peak TDP of 45 W, others – 77 W
  - Variants ending in 'K' have unlocked multipliers; others cannot be overclocked
  - Integrated GPU Intel HD Graphics 4000
  - Variants
    - i7-3770T – 2.5 GHz/3.7 GHz Turbo Boost
    - i7-3770S – 3.1 GHz/3.9 GHz Turbo Boost
    - i7-3770 – 3.4 GHz/3.9 GHz Turbo Boost
    - i7-3770K – 3.5 GHz/3.9 GHz Turbo Boost

=== 64-bit processors: Intel 64 – Haswell microarchitecture ===
==== Core i3 (4th generation) ====
- Haswell (Core i3 4th generation) – 22nm process technology
  - 2 physical cores/4 threads
  - 4 MB L3 cache
  - Introduced Q2'13
  - Socket 1150 LGA
  - 2-channel DDR3L-1333/1600
  - Integrated GPU
  - Variants
    - i3-4370 – 3.8 GHz

==== Core i5 (4th generation) ====
- Haswell (Core i5 4th generation) – 22nm process technology
  - 4 physical cores/4 threads
  - 4 MB L3 cache
  - Introduced Q2'13
  - Socket 1150 LGA
  - 2-channel DDR3L-1333/1600
  - Integrated GPU
  - Variants
    - i5-4460 – 3.2 GHz/3.40 GHz Turbo Boost
    - i5-4590 – 3.7 GHz/3.70 GHz Turbo Boost
    - i5-4690 – 3.5 GHz/3.90 GHz Turbo Boost

=== 64-bit processors: Intel 64 – Broadwell microarchitecture ===
==== Core i3 (5th generation) ====
- Broadwell (Core i3 5th generation) – 14nm process technology

==== Core i5 (5th generation) ====
- Broadwell (Core i5 5th generation) – 14nm process technology
  - 4 physical cores/4 threads
  - 4 MB L3 cache
  - Introduced Q2'15
  - Socket 1150 LGA
  - 2-channel DDR3L-1333/1600
  - Integrated GPU
  - Variants
    - i5-5575R – 2.80 GHz/3.30 GHz Turbo Boost
    - i5-5675C – 3.10 GHz/3.60 GHz Turbo Boost
    - i5-5675R – 3.10 GHz/3.60 GHz Turbo Boost

==== Core i7 (5th generation, Including Core-X Series) ====
- Broadwell (Core i7 5th generation) – 14nm process technology
  - 4 physical cores/8 threads
  - 6 MB L3 cache
  - Introduced Q2'15
  - Socket 1150 LGA
  - 2-channel DDR3L-1333/1600
  - Integrated GPU
  - Variants
    - i7-5775C – 3.30 GHz/3.70 GHz Turbo Boost
    - i7-5775R – 3.30 GHz/3.80 GHz Turbo Boost
- Broadwell-E – 14nm process technology
  - 6–10 physical cores/12–20 threads
  - 15–25 MB L3 cache
  - Introduced Q2'16
  - Socket 2011-v3 LGA
  - 4-channel DDR4-2133/2400
  - No Integrated GPU
  - Variants (all marketed under "Intel Core X-series processors")
    - i7-6800K – 3.40 GHz/3.60 GHz Turbo Boost/3.80 GHz Turbo Boost Max Technology 3.0 Frequency 15 MB L3 cache
    - i7-6850K – 3.60 GHz/3.80 GHz Turbo Boost/4.00 GHz Turbo Boost Max Technology 3.0 Frequency 15 MB L3 cache
    - i7-6900K – 3.20 GHz/3.70 GHz Turbo Boost/4.00 GHz Turbo Boost Max Technology 3.0 Frequency 20 MB L3 cache
    - i7-6950X – 3.00 GHz/3.50 GHz Turbo Boost/4.00 GHz Turbo Boost Max Technology 3.0 Frequency 25 MB L3 cache

==== Other Broadwell CPUs ====
Not listed (yet) are several Broadwell-based CPU models:

- Server and workstation CPUs
  - single-CPU: Pentium D15nn, Xeon D-15nn, Xeon E3-12nn v4, Xeon E5-16nn v4
  - dual-CPU: Xeon E5-26nn v4
  - quad-CPU: Xeon E5-46nn v4, Xeon E7-48nn v4
  - octo-CPU: Xeon E7-88nn v4
- Embedded CPUs
  - Core i7-57nnEQ, Core i7-58nnEQ
- Mobile CPUs
  - Celeron 32nnU, Celeron 37nnU
  - Pentium 38nnU
  - Core M-5Ynn
  - Core i3-50nnU
  - Core i5-5nnnU
  - Core i7-55nnU, Core i7-56nnU, Core i7-57nnHQ, Core i7-59nnHQ

Note: this list does not say that all processors that match these patterns are Broadwell-based or fit into this scheme. The model numbers may have suffixes that are not shown here.

=== 64-bit processors: Intel 64 – Skylake microarchitecture ===
==== Core i3 (6th generation) ====
- Skylake (Core i3 6th generation) – 14 nm process technology
  - 2 physical cores/4 threads
  - 3–4 MB L3 cache
  - Introduced Q3'15
  - Socket 1151 LGA
  - 2-channel DDR3L-1333/1600, DDR4-1866/2133
  - Integrated GPU Intel HD Graphics 530 (only i3-6098P have HD Graphics 510)
  - Variants
    - i3-6098P – 3.60 GHz
    - i3-6100T – 3.20 GHz
    - i3-6100 – 3.70 GHz
    - i3-6300T – 3.30 GHz
    - i3-6300 – 3.80 GHz
    - i3-6320 – 3.90 GHz

==== Core i5 (6th generation) ====
- Skylake (Core i5 6th generation) – 14nm process technology
  - 4 physical cores/4 threads
  - 6 MB L3 cache
  - Introduced Q3'15
  - Socket 1151 LGA
  - 2-channel DDR3L-1333/1600, DDR4-1866/2133
  - Integrated GPU Intel HD Graphics 530
  - Variants
    - i5-6300HQ – 2.30/3.20 GHz Turbo Boost
    - i5-6400T – 2.20 GHz/2.80 GHz Turbo Boost
    - i5-6400 – 2.70 GHz/3.30 GHz Turbo Boost
    - i5-6440hq
    - i5-6500T – 2.50 GHz/3.10 GHz Turbo Boost
    - i5-6500 – 3.20 GHz/3.60 GHz Turbo Boost
    - i5-6600T – 2.70 GHz/3.50 GHz Turbo Boost
    - i5-6600 – 3.30 GHz/3.90 GHz Turbo Boost
    - i5-6600K – 3.50 GHz/3.90 GHz Turbo Boost

==== Core i7 (6th generation) ====
- Skylake (Core i7 6th generation) – 14nm process technology
  - 4 physical cores/8 threads
  - 8 MB L3 cache
  - Introduced Q3'15
  - Socket 1151 LGA
  - 2-channel DDR3L-1333/1600, DDR4-1866/2133
  - Integrated GPU Intel HD Graphics 530
  - Variants
    - i7-6700T – 2.80 GHz/3.60 GHz Turbo Boost
    - i7-6700 – 3.40 GHz/4.00 GHz Turbo Boost
    - i7-6700K – 4.00 GHz/4.20 GHz Turbo Boost

==== Other Skylake processors ====
Many Skylake-based processors are not yet listed in this section: mobile i3/i5/i7 processors (U, H, and M suffixes), embedded i3/i5/i7 processors (E suffix), certain i7-67nn/i7-68nn/i7-69nn. Skylake-based "Core X-series" processors (certain i7-78nn and i9-79nn models) can be found under current models.

=== Intel Tera-Scale ===
- 2007: Teraflops Research Chip, an 80 core processor prototype.
- 2009: Single-chip Cloud Computer, a research microprocessor containing the most Intel Architecture cores ever integrated on a silicon CPU chip: 48.

=== Intel Xeon Phi ===
Manycore processors, originating from the cancelled Larrabee processor.

- 2010: Knights Ferry (32-core processor prototype on 45nm)
- 2012: Knights Corner (Xeon Phi x100 series, with 57 to 61 cores on 22nm)
- 2016: Knights Landing (Xeon Phi x200 series, with 64 to 72 cores on 14nm; introduced AVX-512)
- 2017: Knights Mill (Xeon phi x205 series, with 64 to 72 cores on 14nm; added improved support for deep learning)

=== Intel Quark ===
A product line of SoCs and microcontrollers, targeting much lower size and power consumption than Intel Atom.

- 2013: Clanton (Quark X1000, SoC at 400 MHz, i586 instruction set with x87)
- 2015: Silver Butte (Quark D1000, microcontroller at 32 MHz, runs reduced version of the IA-32 instruction set)
- 2015: Mint Valley (Quark D2000, microcontroller at 32 MHz, i586 instruction set without x87)
- 2015: Atlas Peak (Quark SE C1000, microcontroller at 32 MHz. i586 instruction set without x87)
- 2017: Sue Creek (Quark S1000, non-x86)

=== C&T F8680 ===
The F8680 was an 80186-class SoC originally developed by Chips and Technologies, Inc. − after Intel acquired C&T in 1997, Intel continued shipments of this SoC until 2000.

=== Intel 805xx product codes ===
Intel discontinued the use of part numbers such as 80486 in the marketing of mainstream x86-architecture processors with the introduction of the Pentium brand in 1993. However, numerical codes, in the 805xx range, continued to be assigned to these processors for internal and part numbering uses. The following is a list of such product codes in numerical order:

Product code	Marketing name(s)	Codename(s)
80500	Pentium	P5 (A-step)
80501	Pentium	P5
80502	Pentium	P54C, P54CS
80503	Pentium with MMX Technology	P55C, Tillamook
80521	Pentium Pro	P6
80522	Pentium II	Klamath
80523	Pentium II, Celeron, Pentium II Xeon	Deschutes, Covington, Drake
80524	Pentium II, Celeron	Dixon, Mendocino
80525	Pentium III, Pentium III Xeon	Katmai, Tanner
80526	Pentium III, Celeron, Pentium III Xeon	Coppermine, Cascades
80528	Pentium 4, Xeon	Willamette (Socket 423), Foster
80529	canceled	Timna
80530	Pentium III, Celeron	Tualatin
80531	Pentium 4, Celeron	Willamette (Socket 478)
80532	Pentium 4, Celeron, Xeon	Northwood, Prestonia, Gallatin
80533	Pentium III	Coppermine (cD0-step)
80534	Pentium 4 SFF	Northwood (small form factor)
80535	Pentium M, Celeron M 310–340	Banias
80536	Pentium M, Celeron M 350–390	Dothan
80537	Core 2 Duo T5xxx, T7xxx, Celeron M 5xx	Merom
80538	Core Solo, Celeron M 4xx	Yonah
80539	Core Duo, Pentium Dual-core T-series	Yonah
80541	Itanium	Merced
80542	Itanium 2	McKinley
80543	Itanium 2	Madison
80546	Pentium 4, Celeron D, Xeon	Prescott (Socket 478), Nocona, Irwindale, Cranford, Potomac
80547	Pentium 4, Celeron D	Prescott (LGA 775)
80548	canceled	Tejas and Jayhawk
80549	Itanium 2 90xx	Montecito
80550	Dual-core Xeon 71xx	Tulsa
80551	Pentium D, Pentium EE, Dual-core Xeon	Smithfield, Paxville DP
80552	Pentium 4, Celeron D	Cedar Mill
80553	Pentium D, Pentium EE	Presler
80554	Celeron 800/900/1000 ULV	Shelton
80555	Dual-core Xeon 50xx	Dempsey
80556	Dual-core Xeon 51xx	Woodcrest
80557	Core 2 Duo E4xxx. E6xxx, Dual-core Xeon 30xx, Pentium Dual-core E2xxx	Conroe
80560	Dual-core Xeon 70xx	Paxville MP
80562	Core 2 Quad, Core 2 Extreme QX6xxx, Quad-core Xeon 32xx	Kentsfield
80563	Quad-core Xeon 53xx	Clovertown
80564	Xeon 7200	Tigerton-DC
80565	Xeon 7300	Tigerton
80566	Atom Z5xx	Silverthorne
80567	Itanium 91xx	Montvale
80569	Core 2 Quad Q9xxx, Core 2 Extreme QX9xxx, Xeon 33xx	Yorkfield
80570	Core 2 Duo E8xxx, Xeon 31xx	Wolfdale
80571	Core 2 Duo E7xxx, Pentium Dual-core E5xxx, Pentium Dual-core E2210	Wolfdale-3M
80573	Xeon 5200	Wolfdale-DP
80574	Core 2 Extreme QX9775, Xeon 5400	Harpertown
80576	Core 2 Duo P7xxx, T8xxx, P8xxx, T9xxx, P9xxx, SL9xxx, SP9xxx, Core 2 Extreme X9xxx	Penryn
80577	Core 2 Duo P7xxx, P8xxx, SU9xxx, T6xxx, T8xxx	Penryn-3M
80578	EP80578	Vermilion Range
80579	EP80579	Tolapai
80580	Core 2 Quad Q8xxx, Q9xxx, Xeon 33xx	Yorkfield-6M
80581	Core 2 Quad Q9xxx	Penryn-QC
80582	Xeon 74xx	Dunnington
80583	Xeon 74xx	Dunnington-QC
80584	Xeon X33x3 LV	Yorkfield CL
80585	Core 2 Solo SU3xxx, Celeron 7xx, 9xx	Penryn-L
80586	Atom 2xx, N2xx	Diamondville
80587	Atom 3xx	Diamondville DC
80588	Xeon L3014, E3113	Wolfdale-CL

=== Intel 806xx product codes ===
Product code	Marketing name(s)	Codename(s)
80601	Core i7-9xx, Core i7-9xx Extreme Edition	Bloomfield
80602	Xeon 55xx	Gainestown
80603	Itanium 93xx	Tukwila
80604	Xeon 65xx, Xeon 75xx	Beckton
80605	Core i5-7xx, Core i7-8xx, Xeon 34xx	Lynnfield
80606	canceled	Havendale
80607	Core i7-7xx QM, Core i7-8xx QM, Core i7-9xx XM	Clarksfield
80608	canceled	Auburndale
80609	Atom Z6xx	Lincroft
80610	Atom N400, D400, D500	Pineview
80611	canceled	Larrabee
80612	Xeon C35xx, Xeon C55xx	Jasper Forest
80613	Core i7-9xxX, Xeon 36xx	Gulftown
80614	Xeon 56xx	Westmere-EP
80615	Xeon E7-28xx, Xeon E7-48xx, Xeon E7-88xx	Westmere-EX
80616	Pentium G6xxx, Core i3-5xx, Core i5-6xx	Clarkdale
80617	Mobile Core i5-5xx, Core i7-6xxM/UM/LM	Arrandale
80618	Atom E6x0	Tunnel Creek
80619	Core i7-3xxx	Sandy Bridge-EP
80620	Xeon E5-24xx, Xeon E5-14xx, Pentium 14xx	Sandy Bridge-EN
80621	Xeon E5-16xx, Xeon E5-26xx, Xeon E5-46xx	Sandy Bridge-EP-8, Sandy Bridge-EP-4
80622		Sandy Bridge-EP-8
80623	Core i3/i5/i7-2xxx, Pentium Gxxx, Xeon E3-12xx	Sandy Bridge-HE-4, Sandy Bridge-M-2
80627	Mobile Core i3/i5/i7-2xxxM, Pentium Bxxx, Celeron Bxxx	Sandy Bridge-HE-4, Sandy Bridge-H-2, Sandy Bridge-M-2
80631	Itanium 95xx	Poulson
80632	Atom E6x5C	Stellarton
80633	Core i7-48xx, -49xx	Ivy Bridge-E
80634	Xeon E5-24xx-v2, E5-14xx-v2, Pentium-14xx-v2	Ivy Bridge-EN
80635	Xeon E5-26xx-v2, E5-16xx-v2	Ivy Bridge-EP
80636	Xeon E7-v2	Ivy Bridge-EX
80637	Core i3/i5/i7-3xxx, Xeon E3-12xx-v2	Ivy Bridge
80638	Mobile Core i3/i5/i7-3xxxM	Ivy Bridge
80640	Atom Z24xx	Penwell
80641	Atom D2xxx, Atom N2xxx	Cedarview
80642	Atom Z2xxx	Penwell
80643	Xeon E5-14xx/24xx-v3	Haswell-EN
80644	Xeon E5-16xx/26xx-v3	Haswell-EP
80645	Xeon E7-48xx/88xx-v3	Haswell-EX
80646	Core i3/i5/i7 – 4xxx, Pentium G3xxx, Celeron G18xx, Xeon E3-12xx-v3	Haswell
80647	Mobile Core i5/i7 – 4xxxM	Haswell-H, Haswell-M
80648	Core i7-58xx, -59xx	Haswell-E
80649	Xeon Phi x100	Knight's Corner
80650	Atom Z27xx	Cloverview
80651	Atom Z25xx	Cloverview
80652	Atom Z34xx	Merrifield
80653	Atom Z36xx, Atom Z37xx, Atom E38xx, Celeron N28xx, Celeron J1xxx, Celeron J28xx, Celeron J29xx, Pentium A10xx, Pentium J2xxx, Pentium N35xx	Bay Trail-T, Bay Trail-I, Bay Trail-D, Bay Trail-M
80654	Atom C23xx	Avoton
80655	Atom C2356	Rangeley
80658	Core i3/i5/i7 – 5xxx, Core M – 5Yxx	Broadwell-Y, Broadwell-U, Broadwell-H
80660	Xeon E5-16xx-v4, Xeon E5-26xx-v4	Broadwell-EP
80661	Quark SoC X10xx	Clanton
80662	Core i3/i5/i7-6xxx, Core m3/m5/m7-6Yxx, Pentium G4xxx, Xeon E3-12xx v5, Xeon E3-15xxM v5	Skylake
80663	Atom Z35xx	Moorefield
80664	Atom x5-Z8xxx	Cherry Trail
80665	Atom x5-E8000, Celeron N3xxx, Pentium N37xx, Celeron J3xxx, Pentium J37xx	Braswell
80667	Xeon Phi x200 (standalone socketed processors)	Knights Landing
80668	Celeron N/J33xx, Pentium N/J42xx, Atom x5/7-E39xx	Apollo Lake
80671	Core i7-68xx, -69xx	Broadwell-E
80673	Xeon Bronze/Silver/Gold/Platinum x1xx, Xeon D-21xx, Xeon W-21xx, 3175X, Core i7/i9-7xxx, 9xxx	Skylake-X, Skylake-SP, Skylake-DE
80674	Xeon D-15xx	Broadwell
80677	Core i3/i5/i7-7xxx	Kaby Lake, Amber Lake
80679	Itanium 97xx	Kittson
80680	Celeron N/J4xxx, Pentium N/J5xxx	Gemini Lake
80682	Xeon D-16xx	Hewitt Lake
80683	Xeon Phi 72x5	Knights Mill
80684	Core i3/i5/i7-8xxx, -8Yxx, 9xxx	Coffee Lake, Whiskey Lake
80686	Xeon D-17xx, -18xx, -27xx, -28xx	Ice Lake
80689	Core i3/i5/i7-10xxGx, Xeon Bronze/Silver/Gold/Platinum x3xx, Xeon W-33xx	Ice Lake
80690	Core i3/i5/i7-11xxGx	Tiger Lake
80691	Core i3/i5-LxxGx	Lakefield
80692	Atom P5xxx	Snow Ridge
80695	Xeon Bronze/Silver/Gold/Platinum x2xx, Xeon W-32xx	Cascade Lake
80697	Celeron N45xx/51xx, Pentium Silver N60xx	Jasper Lake

=== Intel 807xx product codes ===
Product code	Marketing name(s)	Codename(s)
80701	Core i3/i5/i7/i9-10xxx	Comet Lake
80703	Atom X6xxx, Celeron N/J62xx, Pentium N/J64xx	Elkhart Lake
80706	Xeon Gold/Platinum x3xxH	Cooper Lake
80708	Core i5/i7/i9-11xxx	Rocket Lake
80711	Arc (Pro) Axxx	Alchemist
80713	Xeon Bronze/Silver/Gold/Platinum/Max x4xx, Xeon w3/w5/w7/w9-x4xx	Sapphire Rapids
80715	Atom X7xxx, Core i3/i5/i7/i9-12xxx, -13xxx, -14xxx, Core 3/5/7/9 1xx, 2xx, Processor 3xx, Nxxx	Alder Lake, Raptor Lake, Amston Lake, Bartlett Lake, Twin Lake
80719	Atom C5xxx	Parker Ridge
80720	Xeon 6xxxP	Granite Rapids
80722	Xeon Silver/Gold/Platinum x5xx	Emerald Rapids
80723	Core Ultra 5/7/9 1xx	Meteor Lake
80726	Arc (Pro) Bxxx	Battlemage
80729	Core Ultra 5/(X)7/(X)9 3xx	Panther Lake
80765	Atom C3xxx	Denverton
80767	Atom P6xxx	Grand Ridge
80768	Core Ultra 5/7/9 2xx	Arrow Lake
80771	Xeon 6xxxE	Sierra Forest
80776	Core 3/5/7 3xx	Wildcat Lake

== See also ==
- List of AMD processors
- List of PowerPC processors
- List of NXP products
- List of Intel Atom processors
- List of Intel Xeon processors
- List of Intel Itanium processors
- List of Intel Celeron processors
- List of Intel Pentium processors
  - List of Intel Pentium Pro processors
  - List of Intel Pentium II processors
  - List of Intel Pentium III processors
  - List of Intel Pentium 4 processors
  - List of Intel Pentium D processors
  - List of Intel Pentium M processors
- List of Intel Core processors
  - List of Intel Core desktop processors
  - List of Intel Core mobile processors
  - List of Intel Core embedded processors
- List of Intel Core 2 processors
- List of Intel Core M processors
- List of Intel Core i3 processors
- List of Intel Core i5 processors
- List of Intel Core i7 processors
- List of Intel Core i9 processors
- List of Intel CPU microarchitectures
- List of Intel graphics processing units
- List of quantum processors
- Apple silicon
