= List of Intel Core embedded processors =

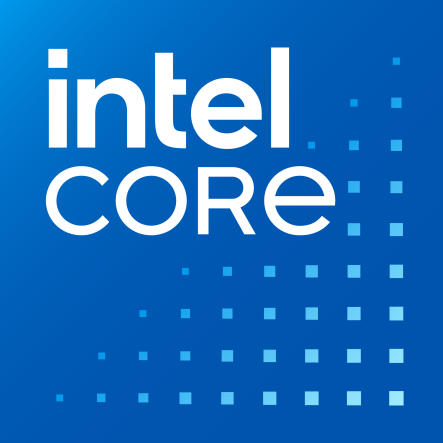
The latest badge promoting the Intel Core branding

The following is a list of Intel Core embedded processors. This includes Intel's original Core (Solo/Duo) mobile series based on the Enhanced Pentium M microarchitecture; as well as its Core 2– (Solo/Duo/Quad/Extreme), Core i3–, Core i5–, Core i7–, Core i9–, Core M– (m3/m5/m7), Core 3–, Core 5–, Core 7–, and Core 9–branded processors.

== Core i (1st gen) ==
=== Arrandale ===
Common features:

- Socket: BGA 1288.
- All the CPUs support dual-channel DDR3 RAM. All models support it at 800 MT/s speeds while E- and LE-suffix models support up to 1066 MT/s speeds.
  - All CPUs except for the i3-330E support ECC memory.
- All CPU models provide 16 lanes of PCIe 2.0.
- All CPUs feature a DMI 1.0 bus to the chipset (PCH).
- L1 cache: 64 KB (32 KB data + 32 KB instructions) per core.
- L2 cache: 256 KB per core.
- Fabrication process: 32 nm.

Processor branding	Model	Cores (Threads)	Clock rate (GHz)		Integrated GPU		Smart Cache	TDP	Release date
Processor branding	Model	Cores (Threads)	Base	Turbo	Model	Clock (MHz)	Smart Cache	TDP	Release date
Core i7	660UE	2 (4)	1.33	2.40	HD Graphics	166–500	4 MB	18 W	August 2010
Core i7	620LE	2 (4)	2.00	2.80	HD Graphics	266–566	4 MB	25 W	January 2010
Core i7	620UE	2 (4)	1.06	2.13	HD Graphics	166–500	4 MB	18 W	January 2010
Core i7	610E	2 (4)	2.53	3.20	HD Graphics	500–766	4 MB	35 W	January 2010
Core i5	520E	2 (4)	2.40	2.93	HD Graphics	500–766	3 MB	35 W	January 2010
Core i3	330E	2 (4)	2.13	—N/a	HD Graphics	500–666	3 MB	35 W	January 2010

== Core i (2nd gen) ==
=== Sandy Bridge-DT ===
The following models from the Sandy Bridge desktop range are available as embedded processors:

- Core i7-2600
- Core i5-2400
- Core i3-2120

See section Desktop processors § Sandy Bridge-DT for full info.

=== Sandy Bridge-M ===
Common features:

- Socket: G2 (2xx0E and 2xx0QE models except i3-2310E), BGA 1023 (all other models).
- All the CPUs support dual-channel DDR3 RAM. All models support it at 1333 MT/s speeds while i7-2710QE and above support up to 1600 MT/s speeds.
  - All CPUs except for the i3-2330E, i5-2510E & i7-2710QE support ECC memory.
- All CPU models provide 16 lanes of PCIe 2.0.
- All CPUs feature a DMI 2.0 bus to the chipset (PCH).
- L1 cache: 64 KB (32 KB data + 32 KB instructions) per core.
- L2 cache: 256 KB per core.
- Fabrication process: 32 nm.

Processor branding	Model	Cores (Threads)	Clock rate (GHz)		Integrated GPU		Smart Cache	TDP	Release date
Processor branding	Model	Cores (Threads)	Base	Turbo	Model	Clock (MHz)	Smart Cache	TDP	Release date
Core i7	2715QE	4 (8)	2.1	3.0	HD 3000	650–1200	6 MB	45 W	January 2011
Core i7	2710QE	4 (8)	2.1	3.0	HD 3000	650–1200	6 MB	45 W	January 2011
Core i7	2655LE	2 (4)	2.2	2.9	HD 3000	650–1000	4 MB	25 W	February 2011
Core i7	2610UE	2 (4)	1.5	2.4	HD 3000	350–850	4 MB	17 W	February 2011
Core i5	2515E	2 (4)	2.5	3.1	HD 3000	650–1100	3 MB	35 W	February 2011
Core i5	2510E	2 (4)	2.5	3.1	HD 3000	650–1100	3 MB	35 W	February 2011
Core i3	2340UE	2 (4)	1.3	—N/a	HD 3000	350–800	3 MB	17 W	June 2011
Core i3	2330E	2 (4)	2.2	—N/a	HD 3000	650–1050	3 MB	35 W	June 2011
Core i3	2310E	2 (4)	2.1	—N/a	HD 3000	650–1050	3 MB	35 W	February 2011

=== Gladden ===
Common features:

- Socket: BGA 1284.
- All the CPUs support dual-channel DDR3-1333 RAM.
- All CPU models provide 16 lanes of PCIe 2.0.
- All CPUs feature a DMI 2.0 bus to the chipset (PCH).
- No integrated graphics.
- L1 cache: 64 KB (32 KB data + 32 KB instructions) per core.
- L2 cache: 256 KB per core.
- Fabrication process: 32 nm.

Processor branding	Model	Cores (Threads)	Clock rate (GHz)		Smart Cache	TDP	Release date
Processor branding	Model	Cores (Threads)	Base	Turbo	Smart Cache	TDP	Release date
Core i3	2115C	2 (4)	2.0	—N/a	3 MB	25 W	Q2 2012

== Core i (3rd gen) ==
=== Ivy Bridge-DT ===
The following models from the Ivy Bridge desktop range are available as embedded processors:

- Core i7-3770
- Core i5-3550S
- Core i3-3220

See section Desktop processors § Ivy Bridge-DT for full info.

=== Ivy Bridge-M ===
Common features:

- Socket: G2 (3xx0ME/QE models only), BGA 1023 (all other models and also i5-3610ME, i3-3120ME).
- All the CPUs support dual-channel DDR3 and DDR3L RAM, at up to 1600 MT/s speed.
  - All CPUs except the i7-3610QE support ECC memory, with ME-suffixed models only supporting it on their BGA-socketed variants.
- i7 models provide 16 lanes of PCIe 3.0, while i5 models provide 1 lane of PCIe 3.0 and i3 models provide 1 lane of PCIe 2.0.
- All CPUs feature a DMI 2.0 bus to the chipset (PCH).
- L1 cache: 64 KB (32 KB data + 32 KB instructions) per core.
- L2 cache: 256 KB per core.
- Fabrication process: 32 nm.

Processor branding	Model	Cores (Threads)	Clock rate (GHz)		Integrated GPU		Smart Cache	TDP	Release date
Processor branding	Model	Cores (Threads)	Base	Turbo	Model	Clock (MHz)	Smart Cache	TDP	Release date
Core i7	3615QE	4 (8)	2.3	3.3	HD 4000	650–1000	6 MB	45 W	April 2012
Core i7	3610QE	4 (8)	2.3	3.3	HD 4000	650–1000	6 MB	45 W	April 2012
Core i7	3612QE	4 (8)	2.1	3.1	HD 4000	650–1000	6 MB	35 W	April 2012
Core i7	3555LE	2 (4)	2.5	3.2	HD 4000	550–1000	4 MB	25 W	June 2012
Core i7	3517UE	2 (4)	1.7	2.8	HD 4000	350–1000	4 MB	17 W	June 2012
Core i5	3610ME	2 (4)	2.7	3.3	HD 4000	650–950	3 MB	35 W	June 2012
Core i3	3217UE	2 (4)	1.6	—N/a	HD 4000	350–900	3 MB	17 W	August 2012
Core i3	3120ME	2 (4)	2.4	—N/a	HD 4000	650–900	3 MB	35 W	August 2012

=== Gladden ===
Common features:

- Socket: BGA 1284.
- All the CPUs support dual-channel DDR3 and DDR3L 1333 MT/s RAM.
- All CPU models provide 20 lanes of PCIe 3.0.
- All CPUs feature a DMI 2.0 bus to the chipset (PCH).
- No integrated graphics.
- L1 cache: 64 KB (32 KB data + 32 KB instructions) per core.
- L2 cache: 256 KB per core.
- Fabrication process: 22 nm.

Processor branding	Model	Cores (Threads)	Clock rate (GHz)		Smart Cache	TDP	Release date
Processor branding	Model	Cores (Threads)	Base	Turbo	Smart Cache	TDP	Release date
Core i3	3115C	2 (4)	2.5	—N/a	4 MB	25 W	Q3 2013

== Core i (4th gen) ==
=== Haswell-DT ===
Common features:

- Socket: LGA 1150.
- All the CPUs support dual-channel DDR3 RAM, at up to 1600 MT/s speed.
  - All CPUs except for the i7-4770TE and embedded variants of desktop models support ECC memory.
- All CPU models provide 16 lanes of PCIe 3.0.
- All CPUs feature a DMI 2.0 bus to the chipset (PCH).
- L1 cache: 64 KB (32 KB data + 32 KB instructions) per core.
- L2 cache: 256 KB per core.
- Fabrication process: 22 nm.

Processor branding	Model	Cores (Threads)	Clock rate (GHz)		Integrated GPU		Smart Cache	TDP	Release date
Processor branding	Model	Cores (Threads)	Base	Turbo	Model	Clock (MHz)	Smart Cache	TDP	Release date
Core i7	4770TE	4 (8)	2.3	3.3	HD 4600	350–1000	8 MB	45 W	June 2013
Core i5	4570TE	2 (4)	2.7	3.3	HD 4600	350–1000	4 MB	35 W	June 2013
Core i3	4340TE	2 (4)	2.6	—N/a	HD 4600	350–1000	4 MB	35 W	May 2014
Core i3	4330TE	2 (4)	2.4	—N/a	HD 4600	350–1000	4 MB	35 W	September 2013

The following models from the Haswell-DT desktop range are also available as embedded processors:

- Core i7-4790S
- Core i7-4770S
- Core i5-4590S
- Core i5-4590T
- Core i5-4570S
- Core i3-4360
- Core i3-4350T
- Core i3-4330

See section Desktop processors § Haswell-DT for full info.

=== Haswell-H ===
Common features:

- Socket: BGA 1364.
- All the CPUs support dual-channel DDR3L RAM, at up to 1600 MT/s speed.
  - All CPUs support ECC memory.
- All CPU models provide 16 lanes of PCIe 3.0.
- All CPUs feature a DMI 2.0 bus to the chipset (PCH).
- L1 cache: 64 KB (32 KB data + 32 KB instructions) per core.
- L2 cache: 256 KB per core.
- Models with Iris Pro 5200 iGPU also feature 128 MB of eDRAM, acting as L4 cache.
- Fabrication process: 22 nm.

Processor branding	Model	Cores (Threads)	Clock rate (GHz)		Integrated GPU		Smart Cache	TDP	Release date
Processor branding	Model	Cores (Threads)	Base	Turbo	Model	Clock (MHz)	Smart Cache	TDP	Release date
Core i7	4860EQ	4 (8)	1.8	3.2	Iris Pro 5200	750–1000	6 MB	47 W	August 2013
Core i7	4850EQ	4 (8)	1.6	3.2	Iris Pro 5200	650–1000	6 MB	47 W	August 2013
Core i7	4701EQ	4 (8)	2.4	3.4	HD 4600	400–1000	6 MB	47 W	Q3 2013
Core i7	4700EQ	4 (8)	2.4	3.4	HD 4600	400–1000	6 MB	47 W	June 2013
Core i7	4700EC	4 (8)	2.7	—N/a	—N/a		8 MB	43 W	March 2014
Core i7	4702EC	4 (8)	2.0	—N/a	—N/a		8 MB	27 W	March 2014
Core i5	4422E	2 (4)	1.8	2.9	HD 4600	400–900	3 MB	25 W	April 2014
Core i5	4410E	2 (4)	2.9	—N/a	HD 4600	400–1000	3 MB	37 W	April 2014
Core i5	4400E	2 (4)	2.7	3.3	HD 4600	400–1000	3 MB	37 W	September 2013
Core i5	4402E	2 (4)	1.6	2.7	HD 4600	400–900	3 MB	25 W	September 2013
Core i5	4402EC	2 (4)	2.5	—N/a	—N/a		4 MB	27 W	March 2014
Core i3	4110E	2 (4)	2.6	—N/a	HD 4600	400–900	3 MB	37 W	April 2014
Core i3	4112E	2 (4)	1.8	—N/a	HD 4600	400–900	3 MB	25 W	April 2014
Core i3	4100E	2 (4)	2.4	—N/a	HD 4600	400–900	3 MB	37 W	September 2013
Core i3	4102E	2 (4)	1.6	—N/a	HD 4600	400–900	3 MB	25 W	September 2013

== Core i (5th gen) ==
=== Broadwell-H ===
Common features:

- Socket: BGA 1364.
- All the CPUs support dual-channel DDR3L RAM, at up to 1600 MT/s speed.
  - All CPUs support ECC memory.
- All CPU models provide 16 lanes of PCIe 3.0.
- All CPUs feature a DMI 2.0 bus to the chipset (PCH).
- L1 cache: 64 KB (32 KB data + 32 KB instructions) per core.
- L2 cache: 256 KB per core.
- Models with Iris Pro 6200 iGPU also feature 128 MB of eDRAM, acting as L4 cache.
- Fabrication process: 14 nm.

Processor branding	Model	Cores (Threads)	Clock rate (GHz)		Integrated GPU		Smart Cache	TDP	Release date
Processor branding	Model	Cores (Threads)	Base	Turbo	Model	Clock (MHz)	Smart Cache	TDP	Release date
Core i7	5850EQ	4 (8)	2.7	3.4	Iris Pro 6200	300–1000	6 MB	47 W	June 2015
Core i7	5700EQ	4 (8)	2.6	3.4	HD 5600	300–1000	6 MB	47 W	June 2015

== Core i (6th gen) ==
=== Skylake-S ===
Common features:

- Socket: LGA 1151.
- All the CPUs support dual-channel DDR4-2133 or DDR3L-1600 RAM.
  - The i3-6100TE supports ECC memory.
- All CPU models provide 16 lanes of PCIe 3.0.
- All CPUs feature a DMI 3.0 bus to the chipset (PCH).
- L1 cache: 64 KB (32 KB data + 32 KB instructions) per core.
- L2 cache: 256 KB per core.
- Fabrication process: 14 nm.

Processor branding	Model	Cores (Threads)	Clock rate (GHz)		Integrated GPU		Smart Cache	TDP	Release date
Processor branding	Model	Cores (Threads)	Base	Turbo	Model	Clock (MHz)	Smart Cache	TDP	Release date
Core i7	6700TE	4 (8)	2.4	3.4	HD 530	350–1000	8 MB	35 W	September 2015
Core i5	6500TE	4 (4)	2.3	3.3	HD 530	350–1000	6 MB	35 W	September 2015
Core i3	6100TE	2 (4)	2.7	—N/a	HD 530	350–1000	4 MB	35 W	Q4 2015

=== Skylake-H ===
Common features:

- Socket: BGA 1440.
- All the CPUs support dual-channel DDR4-2133, DDR3L-1600 or LPDDR3-1866 RAM.
  - All i3 models support ECC memory.
- All CPU models provide 16 lanes of PCIe 3.0.
- All CPUs feature a DMI 3.0 bus to the chipset (PCH).
- L1 cache: 64 KB (32 KB data + 32 KB instructions) per core.
- L2 cache: 256 KB per core.
- Models with Iris Pro 580 iGPU also feature 128 MB of eDRAM, acting as L4 cache.
- Fabrication process: 14 nm.

Processor branding	Model	Cores (Threads)	Clock rate (GHz)		Integrated GPU		Smart Cache	TDP	Release date
Processor branding	Model	Cores (Threads)	Base	Turbo	Model	Clock (MHz)	Smart Cache	TDP	Release date
Core i7	6820EQ	4 (8)	2.8	3.5	HD 530	350–1000	8 MB	45 W	October 2015
Core i7	6822EQ	4 (8)	2.0	2.8	HD 530	350–1000	8 MB	25 W	October 2015
Core i5	6440EQ	4 (4)	2.7	3.4	HD 530	350–1000	6 MB	45 W	October 2015
Core i5	6442EQ	4 (4)	1.9	2.7	HD 530	350–1000	6 MB	25 W	October 2015
Core i3	6100E	2 (4)	2.7	—N/a	HD 530	350–950	3 MB	35 W	October 2015
Core i3	6102E	2 (4)	1.9	—N/a	HD 530	350–950	3 MB	25 W	October 2015

== Core i (7th gen) ==
=== Kaby Lake-S ===
Common features:

- Socket: LGA 1151.
- All the CPUs support dual-channel DDR4-2400 or DDR3L-1600 RAM.
  - All CPUs support ECC memory.
- All CPU models provide 16 lanes of PCIe 3.0.
- All CPUs feature a DMI 3.0 bus to the chipset (PCH).
- L1 cache: 64 KB (32 KB data + 32 KB instructions) per core.
- L2 cache: 256 KB per core.
- Fabrication process: 14 nm.

Processor branding	Model	Cores (Threads)	Clock rate (GHz)		Integrated GPU		Smart Cache	TDP	Release date
Processor branding	Model	Cores (Threads)	Base	Turbo	Model	Clock (MHz)	Smart Cache	TDP	Release date
Core i3	7101E	2 (4)	3.9	—N/a	HD 610	350–1100	3 MB	54 W	January 2017
Core i3	7101TE	2 (4)	3.4	—N/a	HD 610	350–1100	3 MB	35 W	January 2017

=== Kaby Lake-H ===
Common features:

- Socket: BGA 1440.
- All the CPUs support dual-channel DDR4-2400 RAM.
  - All i3 models support ECC memory.
- All CPU models provide 16 lanes of PCIe 3.0.
- All CPUs feature a DMI 3.0 bus to the chipset (PCH).
- L1 cache: 64 KB (32 KB data + 32 KB instructions) per core.
- L2 cache: 256 KB per core.
- Fabrication process: 14 nm.

Processor branding	Model	Cores (Threads)	Clock rate (GHz)		Integrated GPU		Smart Cache	TDP	Release date
Processor branding	Model	Cores (Threads)	Base	Turbo	Model	Clock (MHz)	Smart Cache	TDP	Release date
Core i7	7820EQ	4 (8)	3.0	3.7	HD 630	350–1000	8 MB	45 W	January 2017
Core i5	7440EQ	4 (4)	2.9	3.6	HD 630	350–1000	6 MB	45 W	January 2017
Core i5	7442EQ	4 (4)	2.1	2.9	HD 630	350–1000	6 MB	25 W	January 2017
Core i3	7100E	2 (4)	2.9	—N/a	HD 630	350–950	3 MB	35 W	January 2017
Core i3	7102E	2 (4)	2.1	—N/a	HD 630	350–950	3 MB	25 W	January 2017

== Core i (8th gen) ==
=== Whiskey Lake-U ===
Common features:

- Socket: BGA 1528.
- All the CPUs support dual-channel DDR4-2400 or LPDDR3-2133 RAM.
- All CPU models provide 16 lanes of PCIe 3.0.
- All CPUs feature a DMI 3.0 bus to the chipset (PCH).
- L1 cache: 64 KB (32 KB data + 32 KB instructions) per core.
- L2 cache: 256 KB per core.
- Fabrication process: 14 nm.

Processor branding	Model	Cores (Threads)	Clock rate (GHz)		Integrated GPU		Smart Cache	TDP	Release date
Processor branding	Model	Cores (Threads)	Base	Turbo	Model	Clock (MHz)	Smart Cache	TDP	Release date
Core i7	8665UE	4 (8)	1.7	4.4	UHD 620	300–1150	8 MB	15 W	April 2019
Core i5	8365UE	4 (8)	1.6	4.1	UHD 620	300–1050	6 MB	15 W	June 2019
Core i3	8145UE	2 (4)	2.2	3.9	UHD 620	300–1000	4 MB	15 W	June 2019

== Core i (9th gen) ==
=== Coffee Lake-R ===
Common features:

- Socket: LGA 1151-2.
- All the CPUs support dual-channel DDR4-2400 RAM. i5 models and up support it at up to 2666 MT/s speeds.
  - All i3 models support ECC memory.
- All CPU models provide 16 lanes of PCIe 3.0.
- All CPUs feature a DMI 3.0 bus to the chipset (PCH).
- L1 cache: 64 KB (32 KB data + 32 KB instructions) per core.
- L2 cache: 256 KB per core.
- Fabrication process: 14 nm.

Processor branding	Model	Cores (Threads)	Clock rate (GHz)		Integrated GPU		Smart Cache	TDP	Release date
Processor branding	Model	Cores (Threads)	Base	Turbo	Model	Clock (MHz)	Smart Cache	TDP	Release date
Core i7	9700E	8 (8)	2.6	4.4	UHD 630	350–1150	12 MB	65 W	June 2019
Core i7	9700TE	8 (8)	1.8	3.8	UHD 630	350–1150	12 MB	35 W	June 2019
Core i5	9500E	6 (6)	3.0	4.2	UHD 630	350–1100	9 MB	65 W	June 2019
Core i5	9500TE	6 (6)	2.2	3.6	UHD 630	350–1100	9 MB	35 W	June 2019
Core i3	9100E	4 (4)	3.1	3.7	UHD 630	350–1050	6 MB	65 W	June 2019
Core i3	9100TE	4 (4)	2.2	3.2	UHD 630	350–1050	6 MB	35 W	June 2019

=== Coffee Lake-H (refresh) ===
Common features:

- Socket: BGA 1440.
- All the CPUs support dual-channel DDR4-2666 RAM.
  - The i3-9100HL supports ECC memory.
- All CPU models provide 16 lanes of PCIe 3.0.
- All CPUs feature a DMI 3.0 bus to the chipset (PCH).
- L1 cache: 64 KB (32 KB data + 32 KB instructions) per core.
- L2 cache: 256 KB per core.
- Fabrication process: 14 nm.

Processor branding	Model	Cores (Threads)	Clock rate (GHz)		Integrated GPU		Smart Cache	TDP	Release date
Processor branding	Model	Cores (Threads)	Base	Turbo	Model	Clock (MHz)	Smart Cache	TDP	Release date
Core i7	9850HE	6 (12)	2.7	4.4	UHD 630	350–1150	9 MB	45 W	June 2019
Core i7	9850HL	6 (12)	1.9	4.1	UHD 630	350–1150	9 MB	25 W	June 2019
Core i3	9100HL	4 (4)	1.6	2.9	UHD 630	350–1100	6 MB	25 W	June 2019

== Core i (10th gen) ==
=== Comet Lake-S ===
Common features:

- Socket: LGA 1200.
- All the CPUs support dual-channel DDR4-2666 RAM. i7 models and higher support it at up to 2933 MT/s speeds.
  - All i3 models support ECC memory.
- All CPU models provide 16 lanes of PCIe 3.0.
- All CPUs feature a DMI 3.0 4-lane bus to the chipset (PCH).
- L1 cache: 64 KB (32 KB data + 32 KB instructions) per core.
- L2 cache: 256 KB per core.
- Fabrication process: 14 nm.
- i9-10900E features Thermal Velocity Boost.

Processor branding	Model	Cores (Threads)	Clock rate (GHz)		Integrated GPU		Smart Cache	TDP	Release date
Processor branding	Model	Cores (Threads)	Base	Turbo	Model	Clock (MHz)	Smart Cache	TDP	Release date
Core i9	10900E	10 (20)	2.8	4.7	UHD 630	350–1200	20 MB	65 W	April 2020
Core i9	10900TE	10 (20)	1.8	4.5	UHD 630	350–1200	20 MB	35 W	April 2020
Core i7	10700E	8 (16)	2.9	4.5	UHD 630	350–1150	16 MB	65 W	May 2020
Core i7	10700TE	8 (16)	2.0	4.4	UHD 630	350–1150	16 MB	35 W	May 2020
Core i5	10500E	6 (12)	3.1	4.2	UHD 630	350–1150	12 MB	65 W	April 2020
Core i5	10500TE	6 (12)	2.3	3.7	UHD 630	350–1150	12 MB	35 W	April 2020
Core i3	10100E	4 (8)	3.2	3.8	UHD 630	350–1100	6 MB	65 W	April 2020
Core i3	10100TE	4 (8)	2.3	3.6	UHD 630	350–1100	6 MB	35 W	April 2020

== Core i (11th gen) ==
=== Tiger Lake-UP3 ===
Common features:

- Socket: BGA 1449.
- All the CPUs support dual-channel DDR4-3200 or LPDDR4X-3733 RAM. i5 models and up support LPDDR4X at up to 4266 MT/s speed.
  - All GRE-suffixed models support ECC memory.
- All CPU models provide 4 lanes of PCIe 4.0, in addition to PCIe 3.0 provided by the on-package PCH.
- All CPUs feature a DMI 3.0 bus to the chipset (PCH).
- L1 cache: 80 KB (48 KB data + 32 KB instructions) per core.
- L2 cache: 1.25 MB per core.
- Fabrication process: 10 nm.
- All models have configurable TDP (cTDP), which can be set from a minimum of 12 W to 28 W. Base clocks shown are at 15 W TDP; they will be different depending on the cTDP setting chosen.
- -GRE suffix models have a minimum operating temperature of -40°C as opposed to 0°C for the normal models, and also feature "in-band ECC" for memory.

Processor branding	Model	Cores (Threads)	Clock rate (GHz)		Integrated GPU		Smart Cache	TDP	Release date
Processor branding	Model	Cores (Threads)	Base	Turbo	Model	Clock (MHz)	Smart Cache	TDP	Release date
Core i7	1185GRE	4 (8)	1.8	4.4	Iris Xe (96 EU)	?–1350	12 MB	15 W	September 2020
Core i7	1185G7E	4 (8)	1.8	4.4	Iris Xe (96 EU)	?–1350	12 MB	15 W	September 2020
Core i5	1145GRE	4 (8)	1.5	4.1	Iris Xe (80 EU)	?–1300	8 MB	15 W	September 2020
Core i5	1145G7E	4 (8)	1.5	4.1	Iris Xe (80 EU)	?–1300	8 MB	15 W	September 2020
Core i3	1115GRE	2 (4)	2.2	3.9	UHD Graphics (48 EU)	?–1250	6 MB	15 W	September 2020
Core i3	1115G4E	2 (4)	2.2	3.9	UHD Graphics (48 EU)	?–1250	6 MB	15 W	September 2020

=== Tiger Lake-H ===
Common features:

- Socket: BGA 1598.
- All the CPUs support dual-channel DDR4-3200 RAM.
- All CPU models provide 20 lanes of PCIe 4.0, in addition to 24 lanes of PCIe 3.0 provided by the on-package PCH.
- All CPUs feature a DMI 3.0 bus to the chipset (PCH).
- L1 cache: 80 KB (48 KB data + 32 KB instructions) per core.
- L2 cache: 1.25 MB per core.
- Fabrication process: 10 nm.
- The base clock speed that the CPU runs at corresponds with the configurable TDP (cTDP) setting chosen.
- Minimum operating temperature: 0°C.

Processor branding	Model	Cores (Threads)	Clock rate (GHz)		Integrated GPU		Smart Cache	TDP	Release date
Processor branding	Model	Cores (Threads)	Base	Turbo	Model	Clock (MHz)	Smart Cache	TDP	Release date
Core i7	11850HE	8 (16)	2.1–2.6	4.7	UHD Graphics (32 EU)	350–1350	24 MB	35–45 W	August 2021
Core i5	11500HE	6 (12)	2.1–2.6	4.5	UHD Graphics (32 EU)	350–1350	12 MB	35–45 W	August 2021
Core i3	11100HE	4 (8)	1.9–2.4	4.4	UHD Graphics (16 EU)	350–1250	8 MB	35–45 W	August 2021

== Core i (12th gen) ==
=== Alder Lake-S ===
Common features:

- Socket: LGA 1700.
- All the CPUs support dual-channel DDR4-3200 or DDR5-4800 RAM.
  - All CPUs support ECC memory.
- All the CPUs provide 16 lanes of PCIe 5.0 and 4 lanes of PCIe 4.0, but support may vary depending on motherboard and chipsets.
- All CPUs feature a DMI 4.0 8-lane bus to the chipset (PCH).
- L1 cache:
  - P-cores: 80 KB (48 KB data + 32 KB instructions) per core.
  - E-cores: 96 KB (64 KB data + 32 KB instructions) per core.
- L2 cache:
  - P-cores: 1.25 MB per core.
  - E-cores: 2 MB per E-core cluster (each "cluster" contains four cores).
- Fabrication process: Intel 7.
- Turbo Boost version is 2.0.

Processor branding	Model	P-core (performance)			E-core (efficiency)			Integrated GPU		Smart Cache	TDP	Release date
Processor branding	Model	Cores (Threads)	Clock rate (GHz)		Cores (Threads)	Clock rate (GHz)		Model	Clock (MHz)	Smart Cache	TDP	Release date
Processor branding	Model	Cores (Threads)	Base	Turbo	Cores (Threads)	Base	Turbo	Model	Clock (MHz)	Smart Cache	TDP	Release date
Core i9	12900E	8 (16)	2.3	5.0	8 (8)	1.7	3.8	UHD 770	300–1550	30 MB	65 W	January 2022
Core i9	12900TE	8 (16)	1.1	4.8	8 (8)	1.0	3.6	UHD 770	300–1550	30 MB	35 W	January 2022
Core i7	12700E	8 (16)	2.1	4.8	4 (4)	1.6	3.6	UHD 770	300–1500	25 MB	65 W	January 2022
Core i7	12700TE	8 (16)	1.4	4.6	4 (4)	1.0	3.4	UHD 770	300–1500	25 MB	35 W	January 2022
Core i5	12500E	6 (12)	2.9	4.5	—N/a			UHD 770	300–1450	18 MB	65 W	January 2022
Core i5	12500TE	6 (12)	1.9	4.3	—N/a			UHD 770	300–1450	18 MB	35 W	January 2022
Core i3	12100E	4 (8)	3.2	4.2	—N/a			UHD 730	300–1400	12 MB	60 W	January 2022
Core i3	12100TE	4 (8)	2.1	4.0	—N/a			UHD 730	300–1400	12 MB	35 W	January 2022

The following Alder Lake-S desktop CPUs are also available in embedded variants:

- The i5-12500, i7-12700, and i9-12900 support ECC memory when paired with the W680E chipset.
  - i9-12900
  - i7-12700
  - i5-12500
  - i5-12400
  - i3-12100

=== Alder Lake-U ===
Common features:

- Socket: BGA 1744.
- All the CPUs support dual-channel DDR5-4800, DDR4-3200, LPDDR5-5200 or LPDDR4X-4266 RAM.
- All CPU models provide 8 lanes of PCIe 4.0 and 12 lanes of PCIe 3.0.
- All CPUs feature a DMI 4.0 8-lane bus to the chipset (PCH).
- L1 cache:
  - P-cores: 80 KB (48 KB data + 32 KB instructions) per core.
  - E-cores: 96 KB (64 KB data + 32 KB instructions) per core.
- L2 cache:
  - P-cores: 1.25 MB per core.
  - E-cores: 2 MB per E-core cluster (each "cluster" contains four cores).
- Fabrication process: Intel 7.

Processor branding	Model	P-core (performance)			E-core (efficiency)			Integrated GPU		Smart Cache	TDP		Release date
Processor branding	Model	Cores (Threads)	Clock rate (GHz)		Cores (Threads)	Clock rate (GHz)		Model	Clock (MHz)	Smart Cache	Base	Max. Turbo	Release date
Processor branding	Model	Cores (Threads)	Base	Turbo	Cores (Threads)	Base	Turbo	Model	Clock (MHz)	Smart Cache	Base	Max. Turbo	Release date
Core i7	1265UE	2 (4)	?	4.7	8 (8)	?	3.5	Iris Xe (96 EU)	?–1250	12 MB	15 W	55 W	February 2022
Core i5	1245UE	2 (4)	?	4.4	8 (8)	?	3.3	Iris Xe (80 EU)	?–1200	12 MB	15 W	55 W	February 2022
Core i3	1215UE	2 (4)	?	4.4	4 (4)	?	3.3	UHD Graphics (64 EU)	?–1100	10 MB	15 W	55 W	February 2022

=== Alder Lake-P ===
Common features:

- Socket: BGA 1744.
- All the CPUs support dual-channel DDR5-4800, DDR4-3200, LPDDR5-5200 or LPDDR4X-4266 RAM.
- All CPU models provide 8 lanes of PCIe 4.0 and 12 lanes of PCIe 3.0.
- All CPUs feature a DMI 4.0 8-lane bus to the chipset (PCH).
- L1 cache:
  - P-cores: 80 KB (48 KB data + 32 KB instructions) per core.
  - E-cores: 96 KB (64 KB data + 32 KB instructions) per core.
- L2 cache:
  - P-cores: 1.25 MB per core.
  - E-cores: 2 MB per E-core cluster (each "cluster" contains four cores).
- Fabrication process: Intel 7.

Processor branding	Model	P-core (performance)			E-core (efficiency)			Integrated GPU		Smart Cache	TDP		Release date
Processor branding	Model	Cores (Threads)	Clock rate (GHz)		Cores (Threads)	Clock rate (GHz)		Model	Clock (MHz)	Smart Cache	Base	Max. Turbo	Release date
Processor branding	Model	Cores (Threads)	Base	Turbo	Cores (Threads)	Base	Turbo	Model	Clock (MHz)	Smart Cache	Base	Max. Turbo	Release date
Core i7	1270PE	4 (8)	?	4.5	8 (8)	?	3.3	Iris Xe (96 EU)	?–1350	18 MB	28 W	64 W	February 2022
Core i5	1250PE	4 (8)	?	4.4	8 (8)	?	3.2	Iris Xe (80 EU)	?–1300	12 MB	28 W	64 W	February 2022
Core i3	1220PE	4 (8)	?	4.2	4 (4)	?	3.1	UHD Graphics (48 EU)	?–1250	12 MB	28 W	64 W	Q1 2022

=== Alder Lake-PS ===
Common features:

- Socket: LGA 1700. While sharing the same socket as Alder Lake-S and Raptor Lake-S, this revision of LGA 1700 is electrically incompatible with other 12th and 13th generation Intel Core desktop processors.
- All the CPUs support dual-channel DDR5-4800 or DDR4-3200 RAM.
- All CPU models provide 8 lanes of PCIe 4.0 and 12 lanes of PCIe 3.0.
- All CPUs feature a DMI 4.0 8-lane bus to the chipset (PCH).
- L1 cache:
  - P-cores: 80 KB (48 KB data + 32 KB instructions) per core.
  - E-cores: 96 KB (64 KB data + 32 KB instructions) per core.
- L2 cache:
  - P-cores: 1.25 MB per core.
  - E-cores: 2 MB per E-core cluster (each "cluster" contains four cores).
- Fabrication process: Intel 7.

Processor branding	Model	P-core (performance)			E-core (efficiency)			Integrated GPU		Smart Cache	TDP		Release date
Processor branding	Model	Cores (Threads)	Clock rate (GHz)		Cores (Threads)	Clock rate (GHz)		Model	Clock (MHz)	Smart Cache	Base	Max. Turbo	Release date
Processor branding	Model	Cores (Threads)	Base	Turbo	Cores (Threads)	Base	Turbo	Model	Clock (MHz)	Smart Cache	Base	Max. Turbo	Release date
Core i7	12800HL	6 (12)	2.4	4.8	8 (8)	1.8	3.7	Iris Xe (96 EU)	?–1400	24 MB	45 W	65 W	Q3 2022
Core i7	12700HL	6 (12)	2.3	4.7	8 (8)	1.7	3.5	Iris Xe (96 EU)	?–1400	24 MB	45 W	65 W	Q3 2022
Core i7	1265UL	2 (4)	1.8	4.8	8 (8)	1.3	2.7	Iris Xe (96 EU)	?–1250	12 MB	15 W	28 W	Q3 2022
Core i7	1255UL	2 (4)	1.7	4.7	8 (8)	1.2	2.6	Iris Xe (96 EU)	?–1250	12 MB	15 W	28 W	Q3 2022
Core i5	12600HL	4 (8)	2.7	4.5	8 (8)	2.0	3.3	Iris Xe (80 EU)	?–1400	18 MB	45 W	65 W	Q3 2022
Core i5	12500HL	4 (8)	2.5	4.5	8 (8)	1.8	3.3	Iris Xe (80 EU)	?–1400	18 MB	45 W	65 W	Q3 2022
Core i5	1245UL	2 (4)	1.6	4.4	8 (8)	1.2	2.5	Iris Xe (80 EU)	?–1250	12 MB	15 W	28 W	Q3 2022
Core i5	1235UL	2 (4)	1.3	4.4	8 (8)	1.1	2.5	Iris Xe (80 EU)	?–1200	12 MB	15 W	28 W	Q3 2022
Core i3	12300HL	4 (8)	2.0	4.4	4 (4)	1.5	3.3	UHD Graphics (48 EU)	?–1400	12 MB	45 W	65 W	Q3 2022
Core i3	1215UL	2 (4)	1.2	4.4	4 (4)	0.9	2.5	UHD Graphics (64 EU)	?–1100	10 MB	15 W	28 W	Q3 2022

=== Alder Lake-H ===
Common features:

- Socket: BGA 1744.
- All the CPUs support dual-channel DDR5-4800, DDR4-3200, LPDDR5-5200 or LPDDR4X-4266 RAM.
- All CPU models provide 16 lanes of PCIe 4.0, in addition to 12 lanes of PCIe 3.0 provided by the on-package PCH.
- All CPUs feature a DMI 4.0 8-lane bus to the chipset (PCH).
- L1 cache:
  - P-cores: 80 KB (48 KB data + 32 KB instructions) per core.
  - E-cores: 96 KB (64 KB data + 32 KB instructions) per core.
- L2 cache:
  - P-cores: 1.25 MB per core.
  - E-cores: 2 MB per E-core cluster (each "cluster" contains four cores).
- Fabrication process: Intel 7.

Processor branding	Model	P-core (performance)			E-core (efficiency)			Integrated GPU		Smart Cache	TDP		Release date
Processor branding	Model	Cores (Threads)	Clock rate (GHz)		Cores (Threads)	Clock rate (GHz)		Model	Clock (MHz)	Smart Cache	Base	Max. Turbo	Release date
Processor branding	Model	Cores (Threads)	Base	Turbo	Cores (Threads)	Base	Turbo	Model	Clock (MHz)	Smart Cache	Base	Max. Turbo	Release date
Core i7	12800HE	6 (12)	2.4	4.6	8 (8)	1.8	3.5	Iris Xe (96 EU)	?–1350	24 MB	45 W	115 W	January 2022
Core i5	12600HE	4 (8)	2.5	4.5	8 (8)	1.8	3.3	Iris Xe (80 EU)	?–1300	18 MB	45 W	115 W	January 2022
Core i3	12300HE	4 (8)	1.9	4.3	4 (4)	1.5	3.3	UHD Graphics (48 EU)	?–1150	12 MB	45 W	115 W	January 2022

== Core i (13th gen) ==
=== Raptor Lake-S ===
Common features:

- Socket: LGA 1700.
- All the CPUs support dual-channel DDR4-3200 or DDR5-5600 RAM.
  - All CPUs support ECC memory.
- All the CPUs provide 16 lanes of PCIe 5.0 and 4 lanes of PCIe 4.0, but support may vary depending on motherboard and chipsets.
- All CPUs feature a DMI 4.0 8-lane bus to the chipset (PCH).
- L1 cache:
  - P-cores: 80 KB (48 KB data + 32 KB instructions) per core.
  - E-cores: 96 KB (64 KB data + 32 KB instructions) per core.
- L2 cache:
  - P-cores: 2 MB per core on i7 and above models, 1.25 MB per core on i5 and below models.
  - E-cores: 4 MB per E-core cluster on i7 and above models, 2 MB per cluster on i5 and below models (each "cluster" contains four cores).
- Fabrication process: Intel 7.
- Turbo Boost version is 2.0.

Processor branding	Model	P-core (performance)			E-core (efficiency)			Integrated GPU		Smart Cache	TDP	Release date
Processor branding	Model	Cores (Threads)	Clock rate (GHz)		Cores (Threads)	Clock rate (GHz)		Model	Clock (MHz)	Smart Cache	TDP	Release date
Processor branding	Model	Cores (Threads)	Base	Turbo	Cores (Threads)	Base	Turbo	Model	Clock (MHz)	Smart Cache	TDP	Release date
Core i9	13900E	8 (16)	1.8	5.2	16 (16)	1.3	4.0	UHD 770	300–1650	36 MB	65 W	January 2023
Core i9	13900TE	8 (16)	1.0	5.0	16 (16)	0.8	3.9	UHD 770	300–1650	36 MB	35 W	January 2023
Core i7	13700E	8 (16)	1.9	5.1	8 (8)	1.3	3.9	UHD 770	300–1600	30 MB	65 W	January 2023
Core i7	13700TE	8 (16)	1.1	4.8	8 (8)	0.8	3.6	UHD 770	300–1600	30 MB	35 W	January 2023
Core i5	13500E	6 (12)	2.4	4.6	8 (8)	1.5	3.3	UHD 770	300–1550	24 MB	65 W	January 2023
Core i5	13500TE	6 (12)	1.3	4.5	8 (8)	1.1	3.1	UHD 770	300–1550	24 MB	35 W	January 2023
Core i5	13400E	6 (12)	2.4	4.6	4 (4)	1.5	3.3	UHD 770	300–1550	20 MB	65 W	January 2023
Core i3	13100E	4 (8)	3.3	4.4	—N/a			UHD 730	300–1500	12 MB	60 W	January 2023
Core i3	13100TE	4 (8)	2.4	4.1	—N/a			UHD 730	300–1500	12 MB	35 W	January 2023

The following Raptor Lake-S CPUs are also available in embedded variants:

- All CPUs except the i5-13500, i5-13500T, i3-13100, and i3-13100T support ECC memory when paired with the W680 chipset.
  - i9-13900
  - i7-13700
  - i7-13700T
  - i5-13500
  - i5-13500T
  - i5-13400
  - i5-13400T
  - i3-13100
  - i3-13100T

=== Raptor Lake-U ===
Common features:

- Socket: BGA 1744.
- All the CPUs support dual-channel DDR5-5200, DDR4-3200, LPDDR5-6400 or LPDDR4X-4266 RAM.
  - URE-suffixed CPUs support ECC memory.
- All CPU models provide 8 lanes of PCIe 4.0 and 12 lanes of PCIe 3.0.
- All CPUs feature a DMI 4.0 8-lane bus to the chipset (PCH).
- L1 cache:
  - P-cores: 80 KB (48 KB data + 32 KB instructions) per core.
  - E-cores: 96 KB (64 KB data + 32 KB instructions) per core.
- L2 cache:
  - P-cores: 2 MB per core.
  - E-cores: 4 MB per E-core cluster (each "cluster" contains four cores).
- Fabrication process: Intel 7.

Processor branding	Model	P-core (performance)			E-core (efficiency)			Integrated GPU		Smart Cache	TDP		Release date
Processor branding	Model	Cores (Threads)	Clock rate (GHz)		Cores (Threads)	Clock rate (GHz)		Model	Clock (MHz)	Smart Cache	Base	Max. Turbo	Release date
Processor branding	Model	Cores (Threads)	Base	Turbo	Cores (Threads)	Base	Turbo	Model	Clock (MHz)	Smart Cache	Base	Max. Turbo	Release date
Core i7	1366URE	2 (4)	1.7	4.9	8 (8)	1.3	3.7	Iris Xe (96 EU)	?–1300	12 MB	15 W	55 W	January 2023
Core i7	1365UE	2 (4)	1.7	4.9	8 (8)	1.3	3.7	Iris Xe (96 EU)	?–1300	12 MB	15 W	55 W	January 2023
Core i5	1345UE	2 (4)	1.4	4.6	8 (8)	1.2	3.4	Iris Xe (80 EU)	?–1250	12 MB	15 W	55 W	January 2023
Core i5	1335UE	2 (4)	1.3	4.5	8 (8)	0.9	3.3	Iris Xe (80 EU)	?–1250	12 MB	15 W	55 W	January 2023
Core i3	1315UE	2 (4)	1.2	4.5	4 (4)	0.9	3.3	UHD Graphics (64 EU)	?–1200	10 MB	15 W	55 W	January 2023

=== Raptor Lake-P ===
Common features:

- Socket: BGA 1744.
- All the CPUs support dual-channel DDR5-5200, DDR4-3200, LPDDR5-6400 or LPDDR4X-4266 RAM.
  - PRE-suffixed CPUs support ECC memory.
- All CPU models provide 8 lanes of PCIe 4.0 and 12 lanes of PCIe 3.0.
- All CPUs feature a DMI 4.0 8-lane bus to the chipset (PCH).
- L1 cache:
  - P-cores: 80 KB (48 KB data + 32 KB instructions) per core.
  - E-cores: 96 KB (64 KB data + 32 KB instructions) per core.
- L2 cache:
  - P-cores: 2 MB per core.
  - E-cores: 4 MB per E-core cluster (each "cluster" contains four cores).
- Fabrication process: Intel 7.

Processor branding	Model	P-core (performance)			E-core (efficiency)			Integrated GPU		Smart Cache	TDP		Release date
Processor branding	Model	Cores (Threads)	Clock rate (GHz)		Cores (Threads)	Clock rate (GHz)		Model	Clock (MHz)	Smart Cache	Base	Max. Turbo	Release date
Processor branding	Model	Cores (Threads)	Base	Turbo	Cores (Threads)	Base	Turbo	Model	Clock (MHz)	Smart Cache	Base	Max. Turbo	Release date
Core i7	1375PRE	6 (12)	1.9	4.8	8 (8)	1.9	3.7	Iris Xe (96 EU)	?–1400	24 MB	28 W	64 W	January 2023
Core i7	1370PRE	6 (12)	1.9	4.8	8 (8)	1.9	3.7	Iris Xe (96 EU)	?–1400	24 MB	28 W	64 W	January 2023
Core i7	1370PE	6 (12)	1.9	4.8	8 (8)	?	3.7	Iris Xe (96 EU)	?–1400	24 MB	28 W	64 W	January 2023
Core i5	1350PRE	4 (8)	1.8	4.6	8 (8)	1.8	3.4	Iris Xe (80 EU)	?–1400	12 MB	28 W	64 W	January 2023
Core i5	1350PE	4 (8)	1.8	4.6	8 (8)	?	3.4	Iris Xe (80 EU)	?–1400	12 MB	28 W	64 W	January 2023
Core i5	1340PE	4 (8)	1.8	4.5	8 (8)	?	3.3	Iris Xe (80 EU)	?–1350	12 MB	28 W	64 W	January 2023
Core i3	1320PRE	4 (8)	1.7	4.5	4 (4)	1.7	3.3	UHD Graphics (48 EU)	?–1200	12 MB	28 W	64 W	January 2023
Core i3	1320PE	4 (8)	1.7	4.5	4 (4)	?	3.3	UHD Graphics (48 EU)	?–1200	12 MB	28 W	64 W	January 2023

=== Raptor Lake-H ===
Common features:

- Socket: BGA 1744.
- All the CPUs support dual-channel DDR5-5200, DDR4-3200, LPDDR5-6400 or LPDDR4X-4266 RAM.
  - HRE-suffixed CPUs support ECC memory.
- All CPU models provide 8 lanes of PCIe 5.0 and 8 lanes of PCIe 4.0, in addition to 12 lanes of PCIe 3.0 provided by the on-package PCH.
- All CPUs feature a DMI 4.0 8-lane bus to the chipset (PCH).
- L1 cache:
  - P-cores: 80 KB (48 KB data + 32 KB instructions) per core.
  - E-cores: 96 KB (64 KB data + 32 KB instructions) per core.
- L2 cache:
  - P-cores: 2 MB per core.
  - E-cores: 4 MB per E-core cluster (each "cluster" contains four cores).
- Fabrication process: Intel 7.

Processor branding	Model	P-core (performance)			E-core (efficiency)			Integrated GPU		Smart Cache	TDP		Release date
Processor branding	Model	Cores (Threads)	Clock rate (GHz)		Cores (Threads)	Clock rate (GHz)		Model	Clock (MHz)	Smart Cache	Base	Max. Turbo	Release date
Processor branding	Model	Cores (Threads)	Base	Turbo	Cores (Threads)	Base	Turbo	Model	Clock (MHz)	Smart Cache	Base	Max. Turbo	Release date
Core i7	13800HRE	6 (12)	2.5	5.0	8 (8)	2.5	4.0	Iris Xe (96 EU)	?–1400	24 MB	45 W	115 W	January 2023
Core i7	13800HE	6 (12)	2.5	5.0	8 (8)	1.8	4.0	Iris Xe (96 EU)	?–1400	24 MB	45 W	115 W	January 2023
Core i5	13600HRE	4 (8)	2.7	4.8	8 (8)	2.7	3.6	Iris Xe (80 EU)	?–1400	18 MB	45 W	115 W	January 2023
Core i5	13600HE	4 (8)	2.7	4.8	8 (8)	2.1	3.6	Iris Xe (80 EU)	?–1400	18 MB	45 W	115 W	January 2023
Core i3	13300HRE	4 (8)	2.1	4.6	4 (4)	2.1	3.4	UHD Graphics (48 EU)	?–1300	12 MB	45 W	115 W	January 2023
Core i3	13300HE	4 (8)	2.1	4.6	4 (4)	1.9	3.4	UHD Graphics (48 EU)	?–1300	12 MB	45 W	115 W	January 2023

== Core i (14th gen) ==
=== Raptor Lake-R ===
Common features:

- Socket: LGA 1700.
- P-core only.
- All CPUs support dual-channel DDR4-3200 or DDR5-5200 RAM.
  - All CPUs support ECC memory.
- All CPUs provide 16 lanes of PCIe 5.0 and 4 lanes of PCIe 4.0, but support may vary depending on motherboard and chipset.
- All CPUs feature a DMI 4.0 8-lane bus to the chipset (PCH).
- L1 cache: 80 KB (48 KB data + 32 KB instructions) per core.
- L2 cache: 2 MB per core.
- Fabrication process: Intel 7.
- Turbo Boost version is 2.0.

Processor branding	Model	P-core (Performance)			Integrated GPU		Smart Cache	TDP	Release date
Processor branding	Model	Cores (Threads)	Clock rate (GHz)		Model	Clock (MHz)	Smart Cache	TDP	Release date
Processor branding	Model	Cores (Threads)	Base	Turbo	Model	Clock (MHz)	Smart Cache	TDP	Release date
Core i9	14901E	8 (16)	2.8	5.6	UHD 770	300 - 1650	36 MB	65 W	Q3 2024
Core i9	14901TE	8 (16)	2.3	5.5	UHD 770	300 - 1650	36 MB	45 W	Q3 2024
Core i7	14701E	8 (16)	2.6	5.4	UHD 770	300 - 1650	33 MB	65 W	Q3 2024
Core i7	14701TE	8 (16)	2.1	5.2	UHD 770	300 - 1650	33 MB	45 W	Q3 2024
Core i5	14501E	6 (12)	3.3	5.2	UHD 770	300 - 1550	24 MB	65 W	Q3 2024
Core i5	14501TE	6 (12)	2.2	5.1	UHD 770	300 - 1550	24 MB	45 W	Q3 2024
Core i5	14401E	6 (12)	2.5	4.7	UHD 730	300 - 1550	24 MB	65 W	Q3 2024
Core i5	14401TE	6 (12)	2.0	4.5	UHD 730	300 - 1550	24 MB	45 W	Q3 2024

The following Raptor Lake-S Refresh CPUs are also available in embedded variants:

- All CPUs except for the i5-14400, i5-14400T, i3-14100, and i3-14100T support ECC memory when paired with the W680 chipset.
  - Core i9-14900
  - Core i9-14900T
  - Core i7-14700
  - Core i7-14700T
  - Core i5-14500
  - Core i5-14500T
  - Core i5-14400
  - Core i5-14400T
  - Core i3-14100
  - Core i3-14100T

== Core / Core Ultra 3/5/7/9 (Series 1) ==
=== Meteor Lake-PS ===
Common features:

- Socket: LGA 1851 (electrically incompatible with the socket used by non-embedded processors such as Arrow Lake-S).
- All the CPUs support dual-channel DDR5-5600 RAM.
- All CPU models provide 20 lanes of PCIe 4.0.
- All CPUs feature a DMI 4.0 8-lane bus to the chipset (PCH).
- Includes integrated graphics based on Alchemist architecture.
- L1 cache:
  - P-cores: 112 KB (48 KB data + 64 KB instructions) per core.
  - E-cores: 96 KB (64 KB data + 32 KB instructions) per core.
- L2 cache:
  - P-cores: 2 MB per core.
  - E-cores: 2 MB per E-core cluster (each "cluster" contains four cores).
- All processor models also feature 2× "LP E-Cores" which are clocked at 0.7 GHz base, 2.1 GHz boost (2.5 GHz on HL-suffix models) and have 2 MB of L2 cache.
- Fabrication process: Intel 4 (compute tile).
- Configurable TDP (cTDP) of 12–28 W is featured on UL-suffix models, and 20–65 W on HL-suffix models.

Processor branding	Model	P-core (performance)			E-core (efficiency)			Integrated GPU		Smart Cache	TDP		Release date
Processor branding	Model	Cores (Threads)	Clock rate (GHz)		Cores (Threads)	Clock rate (GHz)		Model	Clock (MHz)	Smart Cache	Base	Max. Turbo	Release date
Processor branding	Model	Cores (Threads)	Base	Turbo	Cores (Threads)	Base	Turbo	Model	Clock (MHz)	Smart Cache	Base	Max. Turbo	Release date
Core Ultra 7	165HL	6 (12)	1.4	5.0	8 (8)	0.9	3.8	Intel Arc (8 Xe-cores)	?–2300	24 MB	45 W	115 W	April 2024
Core Ultra 7	155HL	6 (12)	1.4	4.8	8 (8)	0.9	3.8	Intel Arc (8 Xe-cores)	?–2250	24 MB	45 W	115 W	April 2024
Core Ultra 7	165UL	2 (4)	1.7	4.9	8 (8)	1.2	3.8	Intel Graphics (4 Xe-cores)	?–2000	12 MB	15 W	57 W	April 2024
Core Ultra 7	155UL	2 (4)	1.7	4.8	8 (8)	1.2	3.8	Intel Graphics (4 Xe-cores)	?–1950	12 MB	15 W	57 W	April 2024
Core Ultra 5	135HL	4 (8)	1.7	4.6	8 (8)	1.2	3.6	Intel Arc (8 Xe-cores)	?–2200	18 MB	45 W	115 W	April 2024
Core Ultra 5	125HL	4 (8)	1.2	4.5	8 (8)	0.7	3.6	Intel Arc (7 Xe-cores)	?–2200	18 MB	45 W	115 W	April 2024
Core Ultra 5	135UL	2 (4)	1.6	4.4	8 (8)	1.1	3.6	Intel Graphics (4 Xe-cores)	?–1900	12 MB	15 W	57 W	April 2024
Core Ultra 5	125UL	2 (4)	1.3	4.3	8 (8)	0.8	3.6	Intel Graphics (4 Xe-cores)	?–1850	12 MB	15 W	57 W	April 2024
Core Ultra 3	105UL	2 (4)	1.5	4.2	4 (4)	1.0	3.5	Intel Graphics (3 Xe-cores)	?–1800	10 MB	15 W	57 W	April 2024

== Core / Core Ultra (Series 2) ==
=== Bartlett Lake-S ===
Common features:

- Socket: LGA 1700.
- All the CPUs support dual-channel DDR4-3200 or DDR5-4800 RAM. The Core 5 221E and higher models support DDR5-5600.
  - All CPUs support ECC memory.
- All CPU models provide 20 lanes of PCIe 4.0 or PCIe 5.0.
- All CPUs feature a DMI 4.0 8-lane bus to the chipset (PCH).
- L1 cache:
  - P-cores: 112 KB (48 KB data + 64 KB instructions) per core.
  - E-cores: 96 KB (64 KB data + 32 KB instructions) per core.
- L2 cache:
  - P-cores: 2 MB per core.
  - E-cores: 4 MB per E-core cluster (each "cluster" contains four cores).
- Fabrication process: Intel 7.

Processor branding	Model	P-core (performance)			E-core (efficiency)			Integrated GPU		Smart Cache	TDP	Release date
Processor branding	Model	Cores (Threads)	Clock rate (GHz)		Cores (Threads)	Clock rate (GHz)		Model	Clock (MHz)	Smart Cache	TDP	Release date
Processor branding	Model	Cores (Threads)	Base	Turbo	Cores (Threads)	Base	Turbo	Model	Clock (MHz)	Smart Cache	TDP	Release date
Core 7	251E	8 (16)	2.1	5.6	8 (8)	1.6	4.4	UHD 730	300 - 1660	36 MB	65 W	Q1 2025
Core 7	251TE	8 (16)	1.4	5.4	8 (8)	1.0	3.9	UHD 730	300 - 1660	36 MB	45 W	Q1 2025
Core 5	221E	6 (12)	2.7	5.2	8 (8)	2.1	3.9	UHD 730	300 - 1550	24 MB	65 W	Q1 2025
Core 5	221TE	6 (12)	1.8	5.0	8 (8)	1.3	3.6	UHD 730	300 - 1550	24 MB	45 W	Q1 2025
Core 5	211E	6 (12)	2.7	4.9	4 (4)	2.0	3.7	UHD 730	300 - 1550	20 MB	65 W	Q1 2025
Core 5	211TE	6 (12)	1.7	4.8	4 (4)	1.3	3.4	UHD 730	300 - 1550	20 MB	45 W	Q1 2025
Core 3	201E	4 (8)	3.6	4.8	--			UHD 730	300 - 1550	12 MB	60 W	Q1 2025
Core 3	201TE	4 (8)	2.9	4.6	--			UHD 730	300 - 1550	12 MB	45 W	Q1 2025

== See also ==
- List of Intel Pentium M microprocessors
- List of Intel Celeron processors
- List of Intel Pentium processors
- Intel Core
- Intel Core 2
- Comparison of Intel processors
- Enhanced Pentium M (microarchitecture)
- Intel Core (microarchitecture)
- Penryn (microarchitecture)
- Alder Lake (microprocessor)
