= LGA 1851 =

Intel microprocessor compatible socket for Meteor Lake-PS and Arrow Lake-S

- Release date: October 24, 2024
- Designed by: Intel
- Type: LGA-ZIF
- Chip form factors: Flip-chip
- Contacts: 1851
- FSB protocol: PCI Express
- Processor dimensions: 37.5 mm × 45 mm 1,687.5mm^{2}
- Processors: Meteor Lake-PS; Arrow Lake
- Predecessor: LGA 1700
- Successor: LGA 1954
- Memory support: DDR5
- This article is part of the CPU socket series

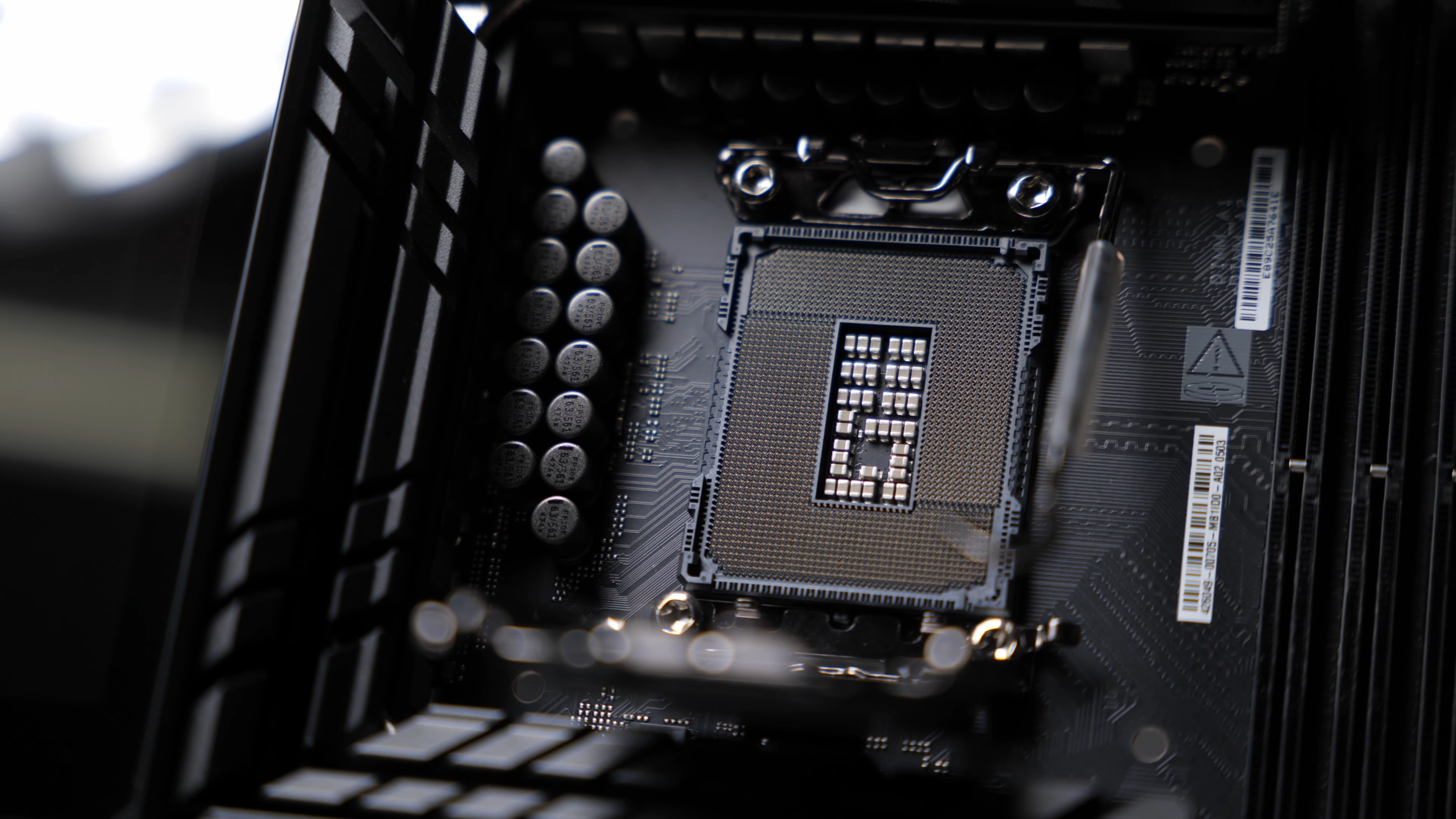
An LGA 1851 socket

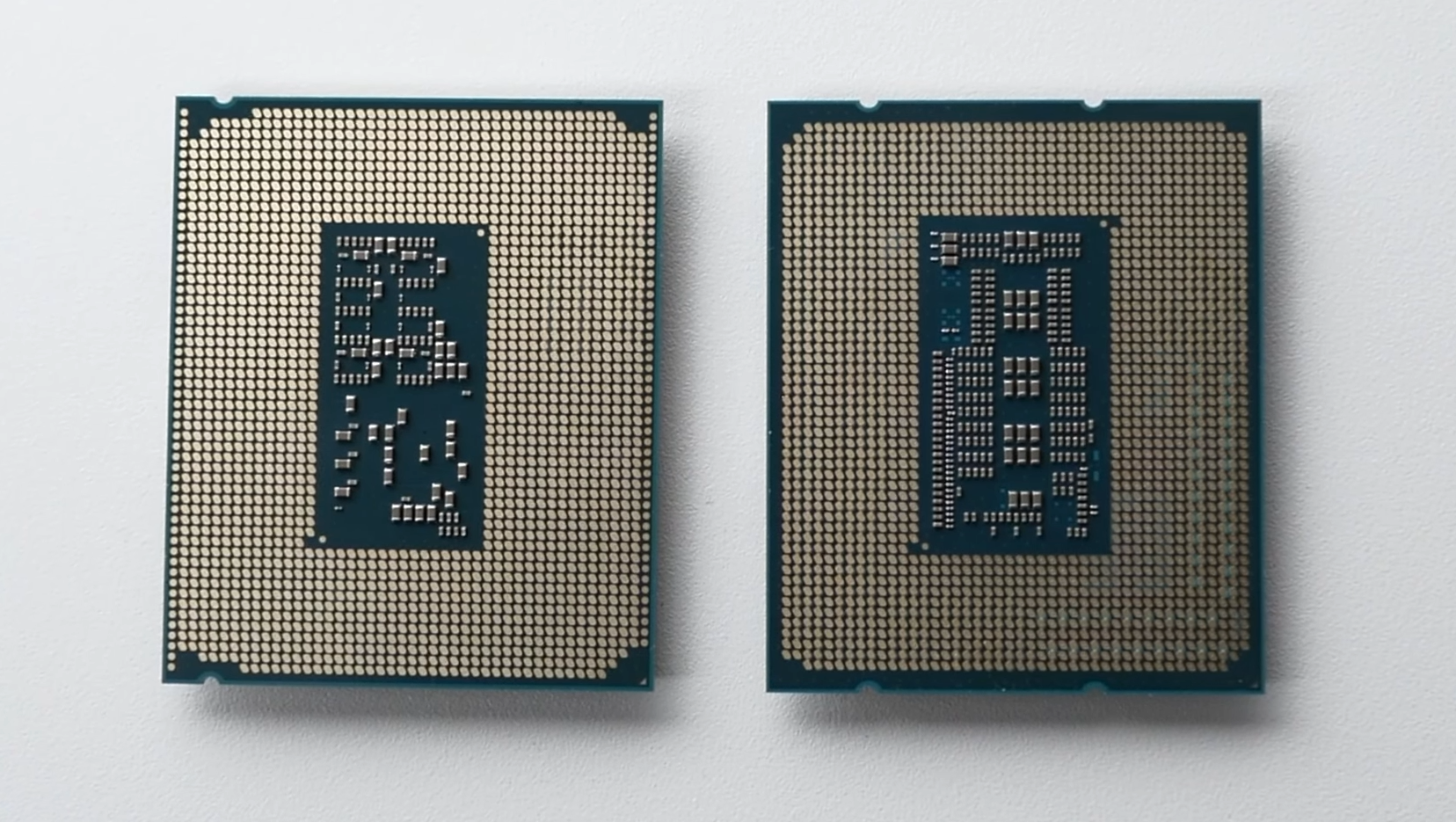
Contacts of the Intel Core Ultra 9 285K (left, LGA 1851), and i9-14900K (right, LGA 1700)

LGA 1851 (codename Socket V1) is a land grid array CPU socket designed by Intel for Meteor Lake-PS embedded and Arrow Lake-S desktop processors, released on October 24, 2024.

The number of contacts has increased, from 1700 (for LGA 1700) to 1851. It uses the same dimensions and cooler mounting hole spacing as LGA 1700, ensuring continued CPU cooler compatibility.

It offers 20 PCIe 5.0 lanes (x16 for the expansion cards and x4 for storage) and an additional 4 PCIe 4.0 lanes for storage. The available PCIe lanes for the expansion cards can now be bifurcated to three devices (x8, x4, x4) instead of two, in case of LGA 1700. Similar to AMD's AM5 socket, LGA 1851 only supports DDR5 SDRAM, dropping support for DDR4 and marking the end of mainstream DDR4 after 10 years.

However, Intel is reportedly planning to release a refresh of LGA 1700 compatible CPUs supporting DDR4 in the first or second quarter of 2027. Intel is believed to be doing this as a result of the current supply shortages with newer DDR5 memory.

== Arrow Lake chipsets (800 series) ==
			H810	B860	Q870	W880	Z890
Overclocking			No	RAM only	No	RAM only	Yes
Bus Interface			DMI 4.0 ×4		DMI 4.0 ×8		
CPU support			Arrow Lake				
Memory capacity			Up to 128 GB	Up to 256 GB			
Maximum DIMM slots			2	4			
ECC memory			No			UDIMM	No
Maximum USB 2.0 ports			10	12	14		
USB 3.2 ports configuration	Gen 1x1		Up to 4	Up to 6	Up to 10		
USB 3.2 ports configuration	Gen 2	×1	Up to 2	Up to 4	Up to 8	Up to 10	
USB 3.2 ports configuration	Gen 2	×2	None	Up to 2	Up to 4	Up to 5	
Maximum SATA 3.0 ports			4		8		
Processor PCI Express configuration		5.0	1×16		1×16 or 2×8 or 1×8+2×4		
Processor PCI Express configuration		5.0 (for M.2)	None	1x4			
Processor PCI Express configuration		4.0 (for M.2)	1x4				
PCH PCI Express configuration		4.0	8	14	20	24	
PCH PCI Express configuration		3.0	None				
Independent display support (digital ports/pipes)			3	4			
Integrated wireless			Intel Wi-Fi 6E AX211 (802.11ax / Wi-Fi 6E / Bluetooth 5.3) (Note: depends on OEM's implementation)				
PCIe RAID support			No		0, 1, 5, 10		
SATA RAID support			No	0, 1, 5, 10			
Intel Optane memory support			No				
Intel Smart Sound technology			Yes				
Intel Active Management, Trusted Execution and vPro technology			No		Yes		No
Chipset TDP			6 W				
Release date			Q1 2025				Q4 2024
