= Meteor Lake =

Intel microprocessor series released in 2023

General information
- Launched: December 14, 2023
- Marketed by: Intel
- Designed by: Intel
- Common manufacturers: Intel; TSMC
- CPUID code: A06A4h
- Product code: 80723

Performance
- Max. CPU clock rate: P-cores: 5.1 GHz; E-cores: 3.8 GHz; LP E-cores: 2.5 GHz
- DMI speeds: x8 16 GT/s

Physical specifications
- Cores: 2–6 P-cores 8 E-cores 2 LP E-cores
- Memory (RAM): Up to 96 GB; Up to dual-channel DDR5-5600 (except 9 W models); Up to dual-channel LPDDR5X-7467 (all models)
- GPU: Intel Arc
- Packages: Flip-chip ball grid array (FC-BGA); Flip-chip land grid array (FC-LGA)
- Sockets: Mobile: BGA 2049; Embedded: LGA 1851

Cache
- L1 cache: 112 KB per P-core: 64 KB instructions; 48 KB data; 96 KB per E-core and LP E-core: 64 KB instructions; 32 KB data
- L2 cache: 2 MB per P-core, E-core cluster and LP E-core cluster
- L3 cache: Up to 24 MB

Architecture and classification
- Application: Mobile
- Technology node: Intel 4 TSMC N5; TSMC N6; Intel 22FFL
- Microarchitecture: Redwood Cove (P-cores); Crestmont (E-cores and LP E-cores)
- Instruction set: x86-64
- Instructions: x86-64
- Extensions: AES-NI, CLMUL, RDRAND, MMX, SSE, SSE2, SSE3, SSSE3, SSE4.1, SSE4.2, AVX, AVX2, FMA3, AVX-VNNI, AVX-IFMA, SHA, TXT, VT-x, VT-d

Products, models, variants
- Product code name: MTL
- Models: Meteor Lake-H; Meteor Lake-U; Meteor Lake-HL; Meteor Lake-UL
- Brand name: Core Ultra

History
- Predecessors: Alder Lake (embedded and 9 W fanless mobile); Raptor Lake (15–45 W premium fanned mobile)
- Successors: Lunar Lake (low power ultralight); Arrow Lake (performance thin & light)

Support status
- Supported

Meteor Lake is the codename for Core Ultra Series 1 mobile processors, designed by Intel and officially released on December 14, 2023. It is the first generation of Intel mobile processors to use a chiplet architecture which means that the processor is a multi-chip module. Meteor Lake's design effort was led by Tim Wilson.

== Background ==
In July 2021, Meteor Lake was initially announced to be coming with a 5–125W TDP range for various segments ranging from ultra low power mobile to enthusiast desktop. The initial tape-in process for Meteor Lake took place in May 2021. The CPU compute tile was confirmed to be fabricated on Intel's 7 nm process (since rebranded to "Intel 4").

In October 2021, Intel said in an earnings call that it had taped out the CPU compute tile for Meteor Lake and after it was received it had powered on within 30 minutes and with expected performance levels. In April 2022, Intel announced that an assembled Meteor Lake mobile processor had been powered-on for the first time in a development milestone.

In March 2023, it was reported that Intel had decided to cancel development of high-end Meteor Lake-S processors for desktop. Meteor Lake-S processors were being designed to fit into the LGA 1851 socket, which is identical in dimensions to LGA 1700, but the cancellation of desktop Meteor Lake meant that the LGA 1851 socket wouldn't debut until Arrow Lake in 2024. The top Meteor Lake-S SKU in development contained 6 Redwood Cove P-cores and 16 Crestmont E-cores, which is two fewer P-cores than the last generation Raptor Lake Core i9-13900K.

At Intel's Innovation event in September 2023, head of Intel's Client Computing Group Michelle Johnston Holthaus confirmed that some Meteor Lake-based processors would come to desktop in 2024. Intel later clarified that socketable desktop Meteor Lake processors would not be coming to the DIY market with the LGA 1851 socket. Instead, Meteor Lake processors in a BGA package will be available on desktop in the form of compact all-in-one PCs. A reason for this, according to a statement by Intel to ComputerBase, is that "Meteor Lake is a power efficient architecture that will power new mobile and desktop designs".

=== Branding ===
Intel announced new branding in June 2023 for upcoming Meteor Lake processors after using the same "Core i" branding for over 15 years. Core branding would be simplified by dropping the 'i' with processors branded Core 3, 5 and 7 instead. The new 'Core Ultra' 5, 7 and 9 branding would be reserved for "premium" processors according to Intel. In addition to the new tier naming, Intel said it would be de-emphasizing processor generations in marketing material, though the processor generation number would remain in the processor number. Meteor Lake processors with Core Ultra branding are classified as first generation Core Ultra.

The new Core and Core Ultra branding was perceived as creating more branding confusion rather than reducing it. Josh Loeffler of TechRadar wrote that "differentiation between Core and Core Ultra is also somewhat head-scratching, especially since there will at least be some overlap between the two brands" as Core 5 and Core 7 processors will exist alongside Core Ultra 5 and Core Ultra 7 processors. In the view of Digital Trends, the new branding emulated AMD and Apple's naming conventions which amounted to Intel "chasing its competitors instead of leading the pack".

Intel Core branding (2020–2023)

Core i3

Core i5

Core i7

Core i9

Intel Core and Core Ultra branding (since 2023)

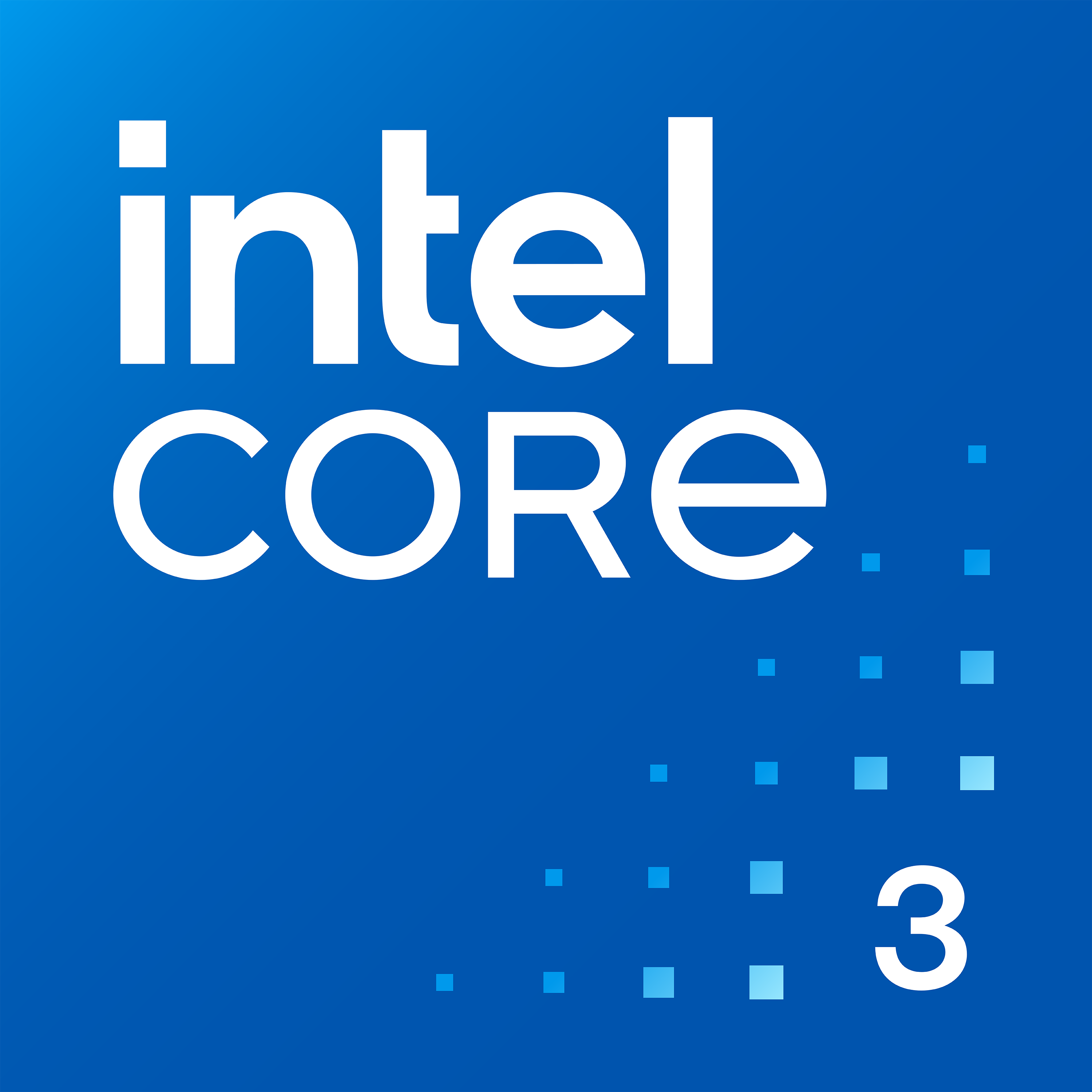
Core 3

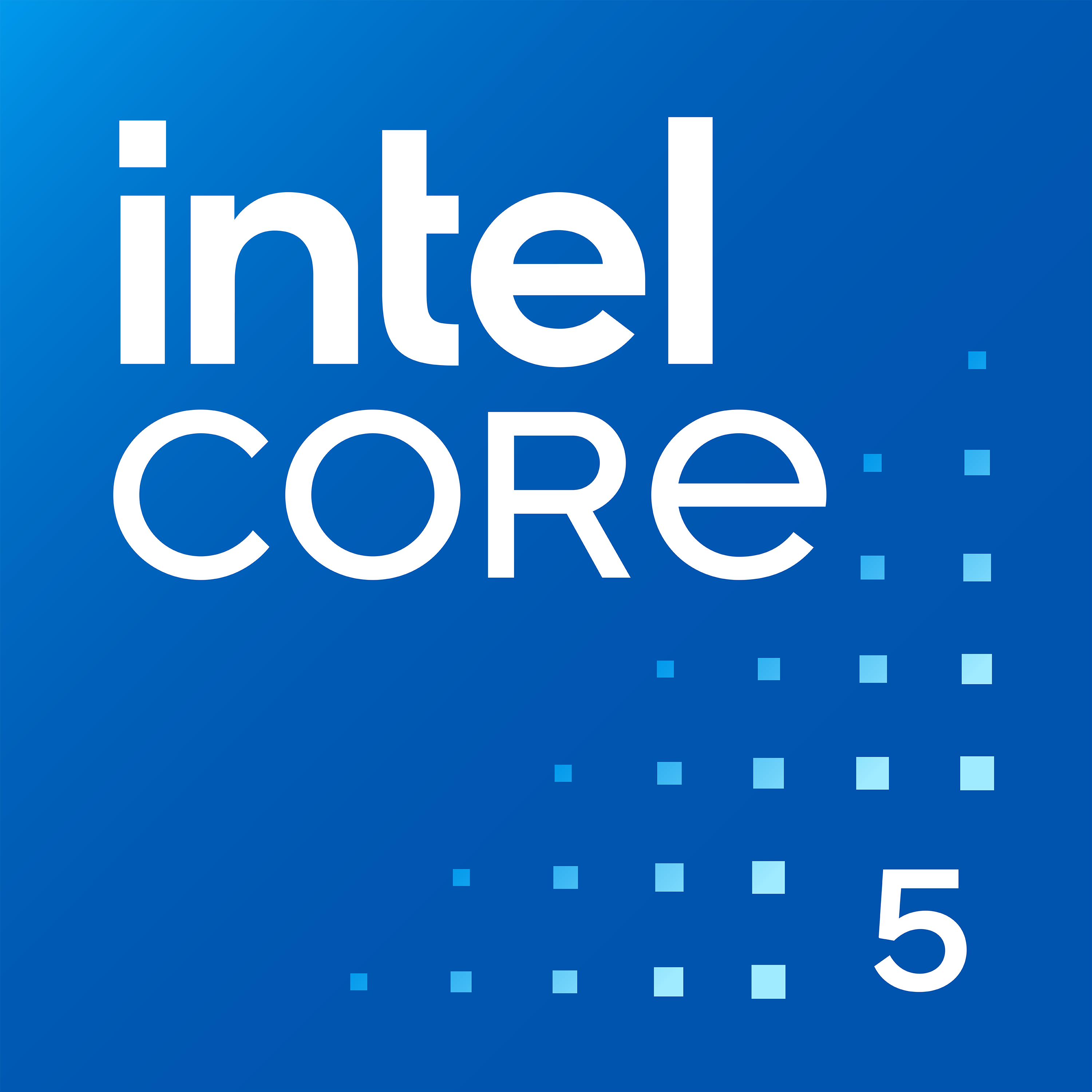
Core 5

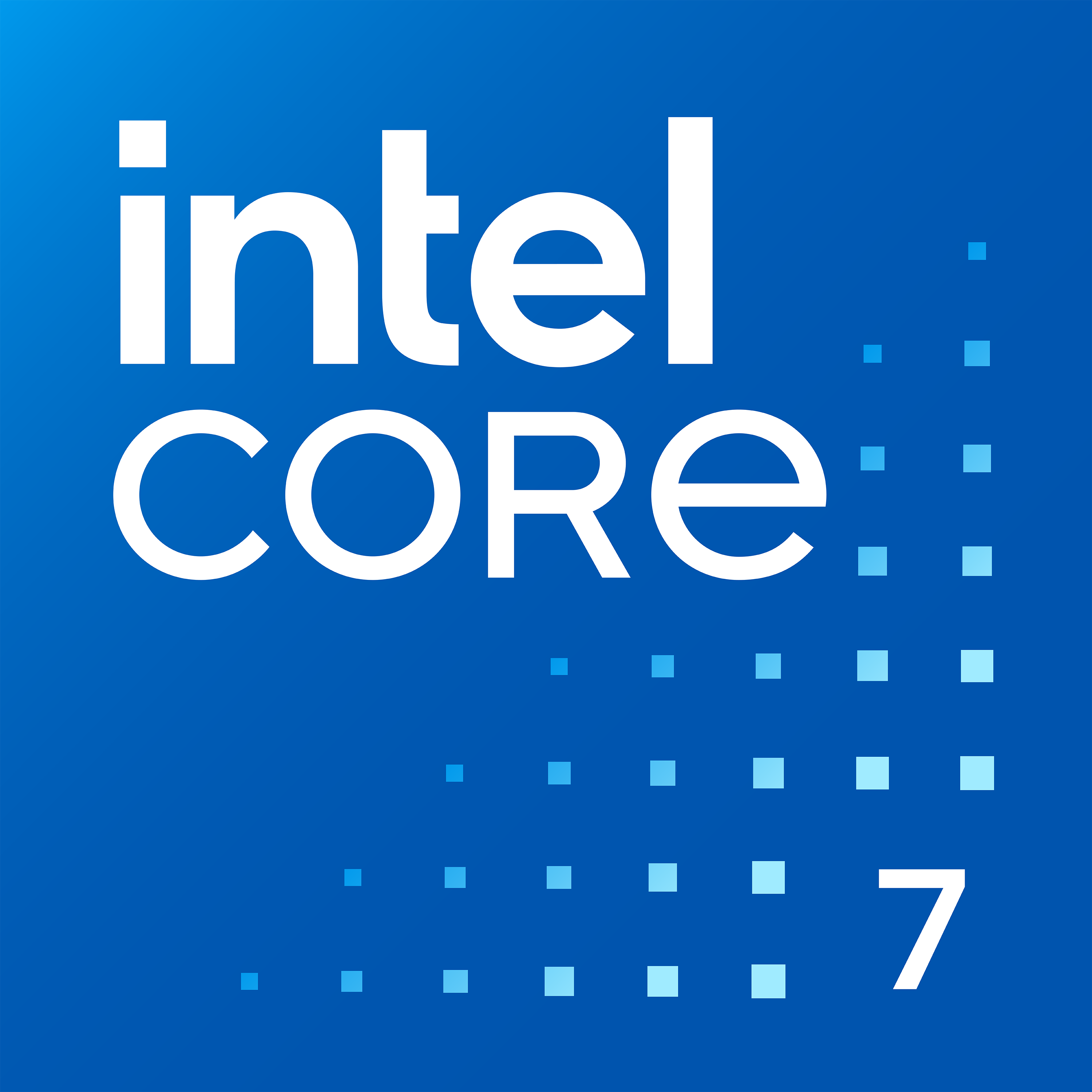
Core 7

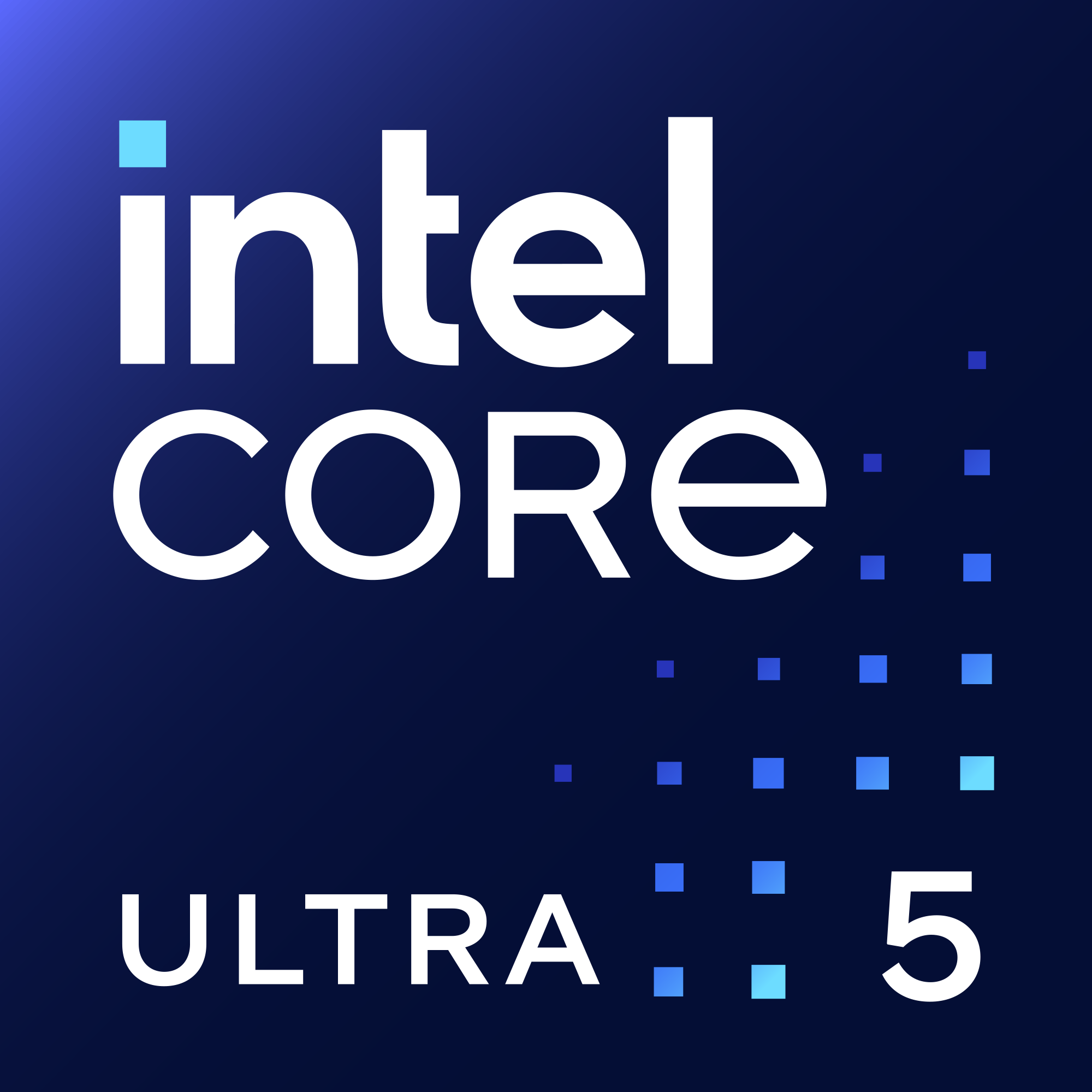
Core Ultra 5

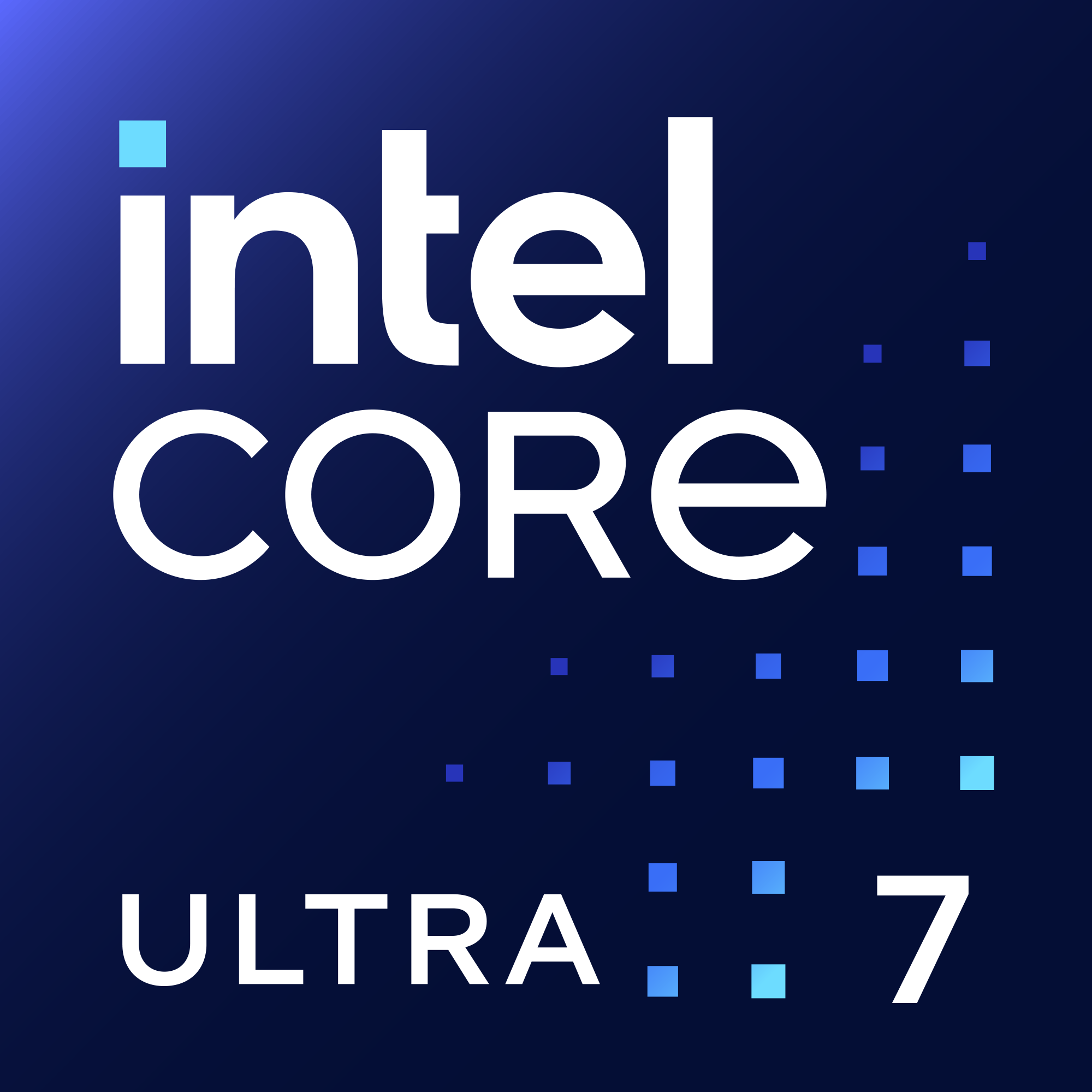
Core Ultra 7

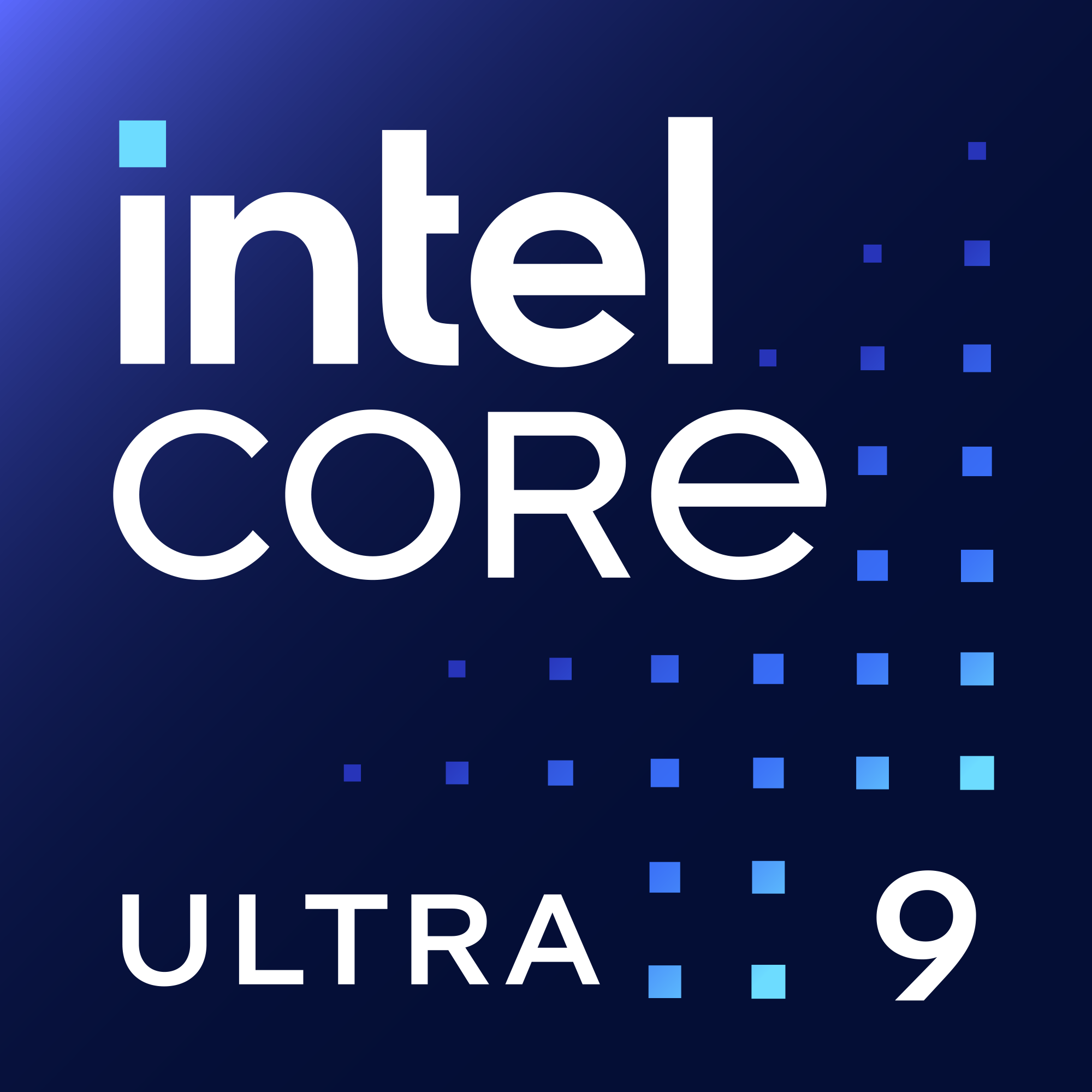
Core Ultra 9

=== Production ===
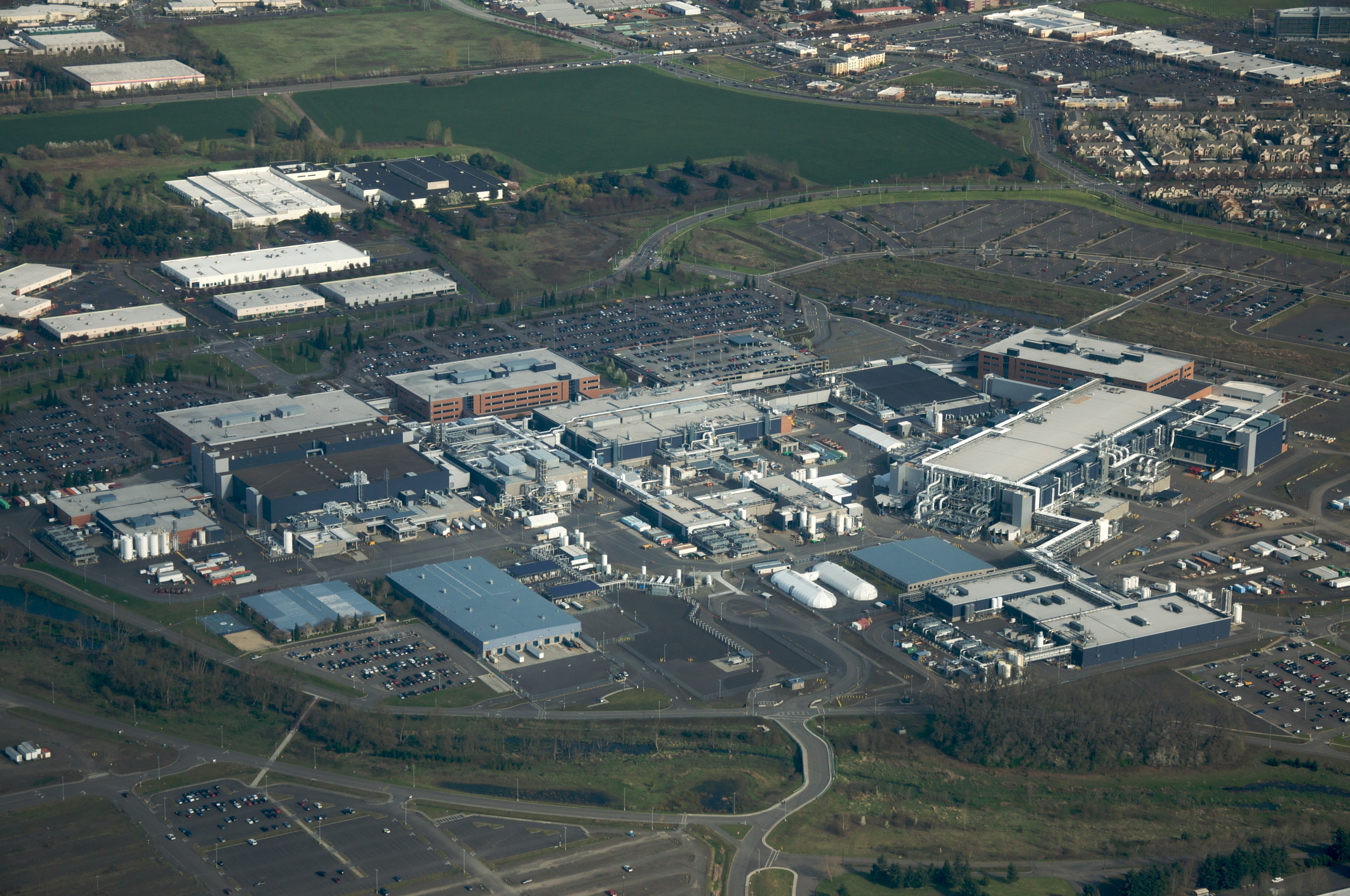
Intel's production facility in Hillsboro, Oregon, where the D1D fabrication facility is located (April 2009)

In April 2023, Meteor Lake and its "Intel 4" process were reportedly ramping to production. Production on Meteor Lake with Intel 4 wafers took place at Intel's D1D fabrication facility in Hillsboro, Oregon. The D1D fabrication facility has a total output of 40,000 wafers a month. Secondary source production for Meteor Lake takes place at Fab 34 in the Republic of Ireland. On September 29, 2023, Intel announced that Intel 4 products, including Meteor Lake, had entered high-volume production at Fab 34 in the Republic of Ireland. The GPU, System on a chip (SoC) and I/O extender tiles in Meteor Lake are manufactured by TSMC in Taiwan.

=== Unveiling and release ===
Meteor Lake was revealed at Intel's Innovation event on September 19, 2023, with the announcement that 'Core Ultra' branded processors would be launching on December 14. However, no list of Meteor Lake SKUs was revealed at Innovation nor release details on regular 'Core' branded processors.

== Architecture ==
=== Packaging ===
Meteor Lake is a 64-bit x86 CPU architecture designed around low power operation and increased power efficiency over Raptor Lake. Meteor Lake is the first Intel microarchitecture to utilize a disaggregated multi-chip module (MCM) approach rather than using large monolithic silicon dies. Previously, in June 2017, Intel had derided AMD's disaggregated chiplet approach in their Ryzen and Epyc processors as using "glued-together" dies.

The first advantage of using smaller dies in an MCM is how it brings better modularity and fabricating smaller dies increases silicon yield rates as more dies can be fitted onto a single 300mm wafer. As a result of greater yields, the use of multiple pre-tested components in an MCM removes the need for binning an entire assembled CPU as is the case with monolithic dies. For example, Raptor Lake desktop silicon with defective graphics is binned into F SKUs with the integrated graphics disabled so they can still be sold while non-F SKUs have their integrated graphics enabled. Instead, Intel can assemble Meteor Lake CPUs using multiple pieces of fully functional silicon while any silicon wafer defects can be discarded entirely. The second advantage is greater flexibility in the use of process nodes. The various dies in an MCM can be fabricated on different nodes depending on their use case. Certain functions like SRAM and general I/O do not linearly scale as logic does with advancements in process node. For example, an I/O die can use a cheaper, more mature process like TSMC's N6 while the CPU die can use a more expensive, advanced node like N5 or N3 for greater power efficiency and frequency.

=== Process technology ===
Due to its MCM construction, Meteor Lake can take advantage of different process nodes that are best suited to the use case. Meteor Lake is built using four different fabrication nodes, including both Intel's own nodes and external nodes outsourced to fabrication competitor TSMC. The "Intel 4" process used for the CPU tile is the first process node in which Intel is utilising extreme ultraviolet (EUV) lithography, which is necessary for creating nodes 7 nm and smaller. The interposer base tile is fabricated on Intel's 22FFL, or "Intel 16", process. The 22FFL (FinFET Low-power) node, first announced in March 2017, was designed for inexpensive low power operation. The interposer base tile is designed to connect tiles together and allow for die-to-die communication which does not require the most advanced, expensive nodes so an older, inexpensive node can be used instead.

Tile	Node	EUV	Die size	Ref.
Compute tile	Intel 4 (7 nm EUV)	Yes	69.67 mm^{2}	
Graphics tile	TSMC N5	Yes	44.25 mm^{2}	
SoC tile	TSMC N6	Yes	100.15 mm^{2}	
I/O extender tile	TSMC N6	Yes	27.42 mm^{2}	
Foveros interposer base tile	Intel 16 (22FFL)	No	265.65 mm^{2}	

=== Compute tile ===
Meteor Lake's CPU compute tile features up to 6 Redwood Cove P-cores and 8 Crestmont E-cores. Each Redwood Cove P-core features SMT with two threads per core while Crestmont E-cores are limited to one thread per core. The 8 total Crestmont E-cores are organized into two 4-core clusters with shared L2 and L3 caches for each cluster. Each Crestmont E-core cluster has 2 MB of L2 cache, the same as a Gracemont E-core cluster. Crestmont maintains the same 6-wide out-of-order core design as Gracemont with enhancements to its pipeline. The branch target buffer in Crestmont gets a boost from 5120 entries to 6144 entries. Intel claims that Crestmont achieves a 3% IPC increase due to the addition of Vector Neural Network Instructions (VNNI) instructions support for AI workloads but Crestmont E-cores still lack support for AVX-512 instructions due to lack of AVX10 support. Testing of Meteor Lake's new Redwood Cove P-cores actually showed an IPC regression in single-core workloads over the previous generation Raptor Cove core.

Meteor Lake's compute tile is fabricated on the Intel 4 node which Intel claims brings a 20% increase in power efficiency and twice the area density for logic over Intel 7. The CPU tile measures around 8.9mm × 8.3mm in dimensions, giving a total die size of 73.87mm^{2}. As a result, roughly 730 CPU dies can be fabricated from a single 300mm wafer, though the usable die yields will be lower than 730.

=== Graphics tile ===
The dedicated graphics tile in Meteor Lake is fabricated using TSMC's N5 node. Contained within the graphics tile are up to 8 X^{e}-LPG graphics cores based on the Alchemist architecture with optimizations for low-power. Intel's Arc A-series discrete graphics cards use X^{e}-HPG cores that are also based on the same Alchemist architecture. Each X^{e} core has 16 X^{e} Vector Engines (XVEs), giving a total of 128 XVEs across the 8 X^{e}-LPG cores. This 128 XVE configuration is a downgrade from the 192 XVEs Intel originally showed for Meteor Lake's graphics in a July 2021 presentation slide. The move to the Alchemist architecture also brings the addition of up to 8 ray tracing units, one in each X^{e}-LPG core. Much like the X^{e}-HPG variant, each X^{e}-LPG core contains a 192 KB L1 cache shared between all 16 XVEs. The 8 X^{e}-LPG cores have access to a 4 MB global L2 cache. However, what the graphics tile is missing from the Alchemist architecture are X^{e} Matrix Extensions (XMX) units. XMX units perform in-silicon AI acceleration, similar to Nvidia's Tensor cores. The lack of XMX units means that the X^{e}-LPG core instead uses DP4a instructions in line with Microsoft Shader Model 6.4.

Meteor Lake's graphics capabilities are greatly increased over the previous generation UHD and Iris Xe integrated graphics in Raptor Lake. Intel claims that Meteor Lake's GPU achieves a 2x increase in performance-per-watt over the Iris Xe graphics featured in Alder Lake and Raptor Lake processors. The graphics tile is able to run at much higher clock speeds compared to Intel's previous integrated graphics in Alder Lake and Raptor Lake. Intel claims that Meteor Lake's GPU can "run at a much lower minimum voltage" and hit boost clock speeds of over 2.0 GHz. There is full support included for the DirectX 12 Ultimate graphics API and Intel's X^{e}SS upscaler, an alternative to Nvidia's DLSS and AMD's FSR. Intel claims that the graphics tile in Meteor Lake can give a similar level of performance to discrete graphics. Tom Petersen claimed that Meteor Lake's integrated graphics performance is "not that far from a [RTX] 3050". Intel demonstrated Dying Light 2 running on Meteor Lake's integrated graphics at 1080p with X^{e}SS performance mode upscaling from 720p. A hardware listing from Dell confirmed that in order to fully make use of the integrated Arc graphics, the system must be configured with at least 16GB of memory running in dual-channel mode. Not meeting the minimum memory requirements means that the system will report using lower performance "Intel Graphics" instead of "Arc" graphics.

=== SoC tile ===
Meteor Lake's SoC tile is the always-active central tile that communicates with other tiles like the CPU and GPU tiles. It provides some I/O functions such as display output unit and the memory controller. Meteor Lake's memory controller is limited to supporting DDR5 and LPDDR5 memory as support for DDR4 memory is dropped. I/O components built into the SoC tile include Wi-Fi 6E and Wi-Fi 7, Bluetooth 5.4, USB4, USB 3.2 2x2, 8 DMI 4.0 lanes and up to four Thunderbolt 4 ports. The SoC tile is fabricated using TSMC's N6 node as it is more cost effective.

The SoC tile also contains two ultra low power Crestmont E-cores that Intel has dubbed a 'Low Power Island' that operates with lower voltage and lower frequency. The SoC's low power E-cores are limited in frequency to 2.5 GHz compared to the 3.8 GHz of the E-cores. These cores are designed to handle deep background tasks for laptops in idle or sleep mode. All deep background tasks being handled by two Crestmont E-cores in the SoC tile allows the inactive CPU tile to be turned off entirely. This is intended to reduce power consumption and extend battery life for laptops in a sleep mode state. These low power E-cores in the SoC tile are prioritised by Intel Thread Director scheduling. If work cannot be contained on the SoC E-cores, it will then be moved to the compute tile's E-cores as the next priority cores. The final priority cores are the 6 P-cores which are used when the work cannot be contained on the compute tile E-cores. The SoC's low power E-cores lack an L3 cache that the Crestmont E-cores in the compute tile have access to. If a low power E-core encounters a data miss in the L2 cache, there is no L3 cache to fall back on so it must instead search the much slower system memory for data.

==== Media engine ====
Rather than the media engine be located on the GPU tile, it is instead placed on the SoC tile so that the GPU tile does not need to be turned on when decoding video or using a display output. This arrangement enables greater power efficiency as the GPU tile is not always active while the system is at idle or under light loads like video playback. There is support added in the media engine for AV1 hardware encoding up to 8K video with 10-bit color depth. Four display pipes provide support for HDMI 2.1 and DisplayPort 2.1 UHBR20 display outputs with the ability to drive up to four 4K 60 Hz HDR monitors at once or one 8K HDR monitor. 1080p and 1440p monitors can be supported with a refresh rate up to 360 Hz.

==== Neural Processing Unit (NPU) ====
Meteor Lake features a Neural Processing Unit (NPU) to provide integrated AI capabilities. The NPU, which Intel previously referred to as a Vision Processing Unit (VPU), uses the technology obtained by Intel when it acquired Movidius in September 2016. Meteor Lake's NPU, which is marketed as Intel AI Boost, uses two Movidius 32-bit LEON microcontrollers called 'LeonRT' for processing host commands and 'LeonNN' for low level hardware scheduling. It is capable of executing 1 FP16 or 2 INT8 operations per cycle but the NPU's Data Processing Unit (DPU) cannot use FP32 data. The 4K (4096) MACs operating at up to 1.4 GHz can perform up to 11 TOPS with the total platform providing 34 TOPS of compute performance when including 5 TOPS from the CPU and 18 TOPS from the iGPU. Meteor Lake's NPU allows AI acceleration and neural processing like Stable Diffusion to be done locally, on silicon rather than in the cloud. The benefit of running such functions locally is that it provides greater privacy and does not require an internet connection or paying a fee to a third party for using their server computing power. AI neural engines were previously included by Apple on their ARM-based M1 SoCs and by AMD with the integrated Ryzen AI engine on their Ryzen 7040 series mobile processors codenamed "Phoenix". Intel CEO Pat Gelsinger claimed that Meteor Lake's NPU would usher in the era of the "AI PC" and compared it to Intel's Centrino chipsets that aided bringing Wi-Fi into the notebook market.

=== I/O extender tile ===
The I/O extender tile is the smallest tile in Meteor Lake, fabricated on TSMC's N6 node. It provides scalable I/O blocks, which is primarily to offer additional connectivity to that of the SoC tile, such as PCIe 5.0 lanes. The I/O tile can be scaled depending on the number of PCIe lanes needed and the speed they operate at.

=== Foveros interposer base tile ===
Meteor Lake uses a passive silicon interposer placed underneath its tiles as an interconnect. The tiles are placed on top of the interposer and are bonded to the interposer using through-silicon via (TSV) connections through the two vertically stacked pieces of silicon. The TSVs connect the dies with a 36 μm pitch to enable die-to-die communication. Placing logic dies on top of an interposer requires TSVs to connect the top dies through the interposer onto the package. By contrast, AMD's chiplet approach uses multiple pieces of silicon that are interconnected via traces on the package substrate. The benefit of AMD's approach is its cost-effective scalability where the same CCDs can be used in both their Ryzen desktop and Epyc server processors. AMD's Infinity Fabric approach comes with the drawbacks of increased latency and using additional power for die-to-die communication at around 1.5 picojoules per bit. Intel's communication via a silicon interposer uses less power, at around 0.3 picojoules per bit, but is more expensive to produce, is less scalable and packaging is more complex. The Foveros interposer base tile is estimated to be 23.1mm × 11.5mm in dimensions with a total die area of 265.65mm^{2}.

However, Meteor Lake processors are not the first Intel processors to utilize vertical die stacking with a base tile. In June 2020, Intel launched Lakefield ultra-low power mobile processors with a 7W TDP. Lakefield used Foveros packaging with a 22 nm base tile and 10 nm compute tile. The compute tile contained heterogenous cores with one Sunny Cove big core and four Tremont small cores, predecessors to Meteor Lake's Redwood Cove and Crestmont cores. Lakefield was discontinued in July 2021.

== Features ==
=== CPU ===
- Up to 16 cores:
  - Up to 6 Redwood Cove performance cores (P-core)
  - 4 or 8 Crestmont efficient cores (E-core), 1 or 2 clusters with 4 cores
  - 2 low power Crestmont efficient cores (LP E-core) on the SoC tile
- L1 instruction cache per P-core increased to 64 KB, up from 32 KB in Raptor Cove
- 2 MB L2 cache for each P-core, E-core cluster and LP E-core cluster
- Up to 24 MB shared L3 cache

=== GPU ===
- Xe-LPG architecture
- Up to 8 Xe cores and 128 Xe Vector Engines (XVEs)
  - 16 XVEs per Xe core
- 8K 10-bit AV1 hardware encoder
- Up to 2.35 GHz frequency
- FP64 native hardware support
- Hardware based real-time ray tracing

=== NPU ===
- Intel AI Boost NPU accelerator up to 1.4 GHz frequency
- 4K MAC with each MAC capable of 1 fp16 or 2 int8 operations per cycle
  - 11 TOPS NPU performance
  - 34 TOPS combined AI performance (5 TOPS CPU + 18 TOPS GPU)
- 4 digital signal processors
- 4 MB dedicated static memory
- LeonRT front-end processor
- Support APIs like DirectML, OpenGL, OpenVX and Vulkan

=== I/O ===
- up to 96 GB LPDDR5X-7467 on all processors, and DDR5-5600 memory on 15 W, 28 W, and 45 W processors
  - Support for DDR4 and LPDDR4X memory was dropped
- up to 8 PCI Express 5.0 lanes and 20 PCI Express 4.0 lanes on H-series processors, up to 20 PCI Express 4.0 lanes on U-series, UL-series and HL-series processors
- 8 Direct Media Interface 4.0 lanes
- 4 Thunderbolt 4.0 ports
- Wi-Fi 6E support
- DisplayPort 2.1 UHBR20 native support
- HDMI 2.1 48 Gbit/s native support

== List of Core Ultra Series 1 processors ==
=== Mobile processors ===
==== Meteor Lake-H ====
155H, 165H, and 185H support P-core Turbo Boost 3.0 running at the same frequency as Turbo Boost 2.0.

Processor branding	Model	Cores (threads)			Base clock rate (GHz)			Turbo Boost (GHz)			Arc graphics		Smart cache	TDP			Release date	Price (USD) (Note: Price is Recommended Customer Price (RCP) at launch. RCP is the trade price that processors are sold by Intel to retailers and OEMs. Actual MSRP for consumers is higher.)
Processor branding	Model	P	E	LP-E	P	E	LP-E	P	E	LP-E	Xe-cores (XVEs)	Max. freq. (GHz)	Smart cache	Base	cTDP	Turbo	Release date	Price (USD)
Core Ultra 9	185H	6 (12)	8 (8)	2 (2)	2.3	1.8	1.0	5.1	3.8	2.5	8 (128)	2.35	24 MB	45 W	35–65 W	115 W	Q4'23	$640
Core Ultra 7	165H	6 (12)	8 (8)	2 (2)	1.4	0.9	0.7	5.0	3.8	2.5	8 (128)	2.3	24 MB	28 W	20–65 W	115 W	Q4'23	$460
Core Ultra 7	155H	6 (12)	8 (8)	2 (2)	1.4	0.9	0.7	4.8	3.8	2.5	8 (128)	2.25	24 MB	28 W	20–65 W	115 W	Q4'23	$503
Core Ultra 5	135H	4 (8)	8 (8)	2 (2)	1.7	1.2	0.7	4.6	3.6	2.5	8 (128)	2.2	18 MB	28 W	20–65 W	115 W	Q4'23	$342
Core Ultra 5	125H	4 (8)	8 (8)	2 (2)	1.2	0.7	0.7	4.5	3.6	2.5	7 (112)	2.2	18 MB	28 W	20–65 W	115 W	Q4'23	$375

==== Meteor Lake-U ====
The integrated GPU is branded as "Intel Graphics" but still use the same GPU microarchitecture as "Intel Arc Graphics" on the H series models.

All models support DDR5 memory except 134U and 164U.

Processor branding	Model	Cores (threads)			Base clock rate (GHz)			Turbo Boost (GHz)			Intel Graphics		Smart cache	TDP			Release date	Price (USD) (Note: Price is Recommended Customer Price (RCP) at launch. RCP is the trade price that processors are sold by Intel to retailers and OEMs. Actual MSRP for consumers is higher.)
Processor branding	Model	P	E	LP-E	P	E	LP-E	P	E	LP-E	Xe-cores (XVEs)	Max. freq. (GHz)	Smart cache	Base	cTDP	Turbo	Release date	Price (USD)
Low power (MTL-U15)
Core Ultra 7	165U	2 (4)	8 (8)	2 (2)	1.7	1.2	0.7	4.9	3.8	2.1	4 (64)	2.0	12 MB	15 W	12–28 W	57 W	Q4'23	$448
Core Ultra 7	155U	2 (4)	8 (8)	2 (2)	1.7	1.2	0.7	4.8	3.8	2.1	4 (64)	1.95	12 MB	15 W	12–28 W	57 W	Q4'23	$490
Core Ultra 5	135U	2 (4)	8 (8)	2 (2)	1.6	1.1	0.7	4.4	3.6	2.1	4 (64)	1.9	12 MB	15 W	12–28 W	57 W	Q4'23	$332
Core Ultra 5	125U	2 (4)	8 (8)	2 (2)	1.3	0.8	0.7	4.3	3.6	2.1	4 (64)	1.85	12 MB	15 W	12–28 W	57 W	Q4'23	$363
Core Ultra 5	115U	2 (4)	4 (4)	2 (2)	1.5	1.0	0.7	4.2	3.5	2.1	3 (48)	1.8	10 MB	15 W	12–28 W	57 W	Q4'23	unspecified
Ultra low power (MTL-U9)
Core Ultra 7	164U	2 (4)	8 (8)	2 (2)	1.1	0.7	0.4	4.8	3.8	2.1	4 (64)	1.8	12 MB	9 W	9–15 W	30 W	Q4'23	$448
Core Ultra 5	134U	2 (4)	8 (8)	2 (2)	0.7	0.5	0.4	4.4	3.6	2.1	4 (64)	1.75	12 MB	9 W	9–15 W	30 W	Q4'23	$332

=== Processors for Internet of Things (IoT) devices and embedded systems (Meteor Lake-PS) ===
==== High-power ====
155HL and 165HL support P-core Turbo Boost 3.0 running at the same frequency as Turbo Boost 2.0.

Processor branding	Model	Cores (threads)			Base clock rate (GHz)			Turbo Boost (GHz)			Arc graphics		Smart cache	TDP			Release date	Price (USD) (Note: Price is Recommended Customer Price (RCP) at launch. RCP is the trade price that processors are sold by Intel to retailers and OEMs. Actual MSRP for consumers is higher.)
Processor branding	Model	P	E	LP-E	P	E	LP-E	P	E	LP-E	Xe-cores (XVEs)	Max. freq. (GHz)	Smart cache	Base	cTDP	Turbo	Release date	Price (USD)
Core Ultra 7	165HL	6 (12)	8 (8)	2 (2)	1.4	0.9	0.7	5.0	3.8	2.5	8 (128)	2.3	24 MB	45 W	20–65 W	115 W	Q2'24	$459
Core Ultra 7	155HL	6 (12)	8 (8)	2 (2)	1.4	0.9	0.7	4.8	3.8	2.5	8 (128)	2.25	24 MB	45 W	20–65 W	115 W	Q2'24	$438
Core Ultra 5	135HL	4 (8)	8 (8)	2 (2)	1.7	1.2	0.7	4.6	3.6	2.5	8 (128)	2.2	18 MB	45 W	20–65 W	115 W	Q2'24	$341
Core Ultra 5	125HL	4 (8)	8 (8)	2 (2)	1.2	0.7	0.7	4.5	3.6	2.5	7 (112)	2.2	18 MB	45 W	20–65 W	115 W	Q2'24	$325

==== Low-power ====
The integrated GPU is branded as "Intel Graphics" but still use the same GPU microarchitecture as "Intel Arc Graphics" on the high-power models.

Processor branding	Model	Cores (threads)			Base clock rate (GHz)			Turbo Boost (GHz)			Intel Graphics		Smart cache	TDP			Release date	Price (USD) (Note: Price is Recommended Customer Price (RCP) at launch. RCP is the trade price that processors are sold by Intel to retailers and OEMs. Actual MSRP for consumers is higher.)
Processor branding	Model	P	E	LP-E	P	E	LP-E	P	E	LP-E	Xe-cores (XVEs)	Max. freq. (GHz)	Smart cache	Base	cTDP	Turbo	Release date	Price (USD)
Core Ultra 7	165UL	2 (4)	8 (8)	2 (2)	1.7	1.2	0.7	4.9	3.8	2.1	4 (64)	2.0	12 MB	15 W	12–28 W	57 W	Q2'24	$447
Core Ultra 7	155UL	2 (4)	8 (8)	2 (2)	1.7	1.2	0.7	4.8	3.8	2.1	4 (64)	1.95	12 MB	15 W	12–28 W	57 W	Q2'24	$426
Core Ultra 5	135UL	2 (4)	8 (8)	2 (2)	1.6	1.1	0.7	4.4	3.6	2.1	4 (64)	1.9	12 MB	15 W	12–28 W	57 W	Q2'24	$331
Core Ultra 5	125UL	2 (4)	8 (8)	2 (2)	1.3	0.8	0.7	4.3	3.6	2.1	4 (64)	1.85	12 MB	15 W	12–28 W	57 W	Q2'24	$309
Core Ultra 3	105UL	2 (4)	4 (4)	2 (2)	1.5	1.0	0.7	4.2	3.5	2.1	3 (48)	1.8	10 MB	15 W	12–28 W	57 W	Q2'24	$295

== See also ==
- Redwood Cove (microarchitecture)
- Crestmont (microarchitecture)
- Granite Rapids, the Xeon 6 family
- Intel Core
- List of Intel CPU microarchitectures

Atom (ULV)		Node name	Pentium/Core						
Microarch.	Step	Node name	Microarch.	Step					
		600 nm	P6	Pentium Pro (133 MHz)					
		500 nm	P6	Pentium Pro (150 MHz)					
		350 nm	P6	Pentium Pro (166–200 MHz)					
		350 nm	P6	Klamath					
		250 nm	P6	Deschutes					
		250 nm	P6	Katmai	NetBurst				
		180 nm	P6	Coppermine	Willamette				
		130 nm	P6	Tualatin	Northwood				
		130 nm	Pentium M	Banias	Northwood		NetBurst(HT)		NetBurst(×2)
		90 nm	Pentium M	Dothan	Prescott	⇨	Prescott‑2M	⇨	Smithfield
		90 nm	Pentium M	Dothan	~~Tejas~~	→	⇩	→	~~Cedarmill (Tejas)~~
		65 nm	Pentium M	Yonah	~~Nehalem (NetBurst)~~		Cedar Mill	⇨	Presler
		65 nm	Core	Merom	4 cores on mainstream desktop, DDR3 introduced				
Bonnell	Bonnell	45 nm	Core	Penryn					
Bonnell	Bonnell	45 nm	Nehalem	Nehalem	HT reintroduced, integrated MC, PCH; L3-cache introduced, 256 KB L2-cache/core				
Bonnell	Saltwell	32 nm	Nehalem	Westmere	Introduced GPU on same package and AES-NI				
Bonnell	Saltwell	32 nm	Sandy Bridge	Sandy Bridge	On-die ring bus, no more non-UEFI motherboards				
Silvermont	Silvermont	22 nm	Sandy Bridge	Ivy Bridge					
Silvermont	Silvermont	22 nm	Haswell	Haswell	Fully integrated voltage regulator				
Silvermont	Airmont	14 nm	Haswell	Broadwell					
Silvermont	Airmont	14 nm	Skylake	Skylake	DDR4 introduced on mainstream desktop				
Goldmont		14 nm	Skylake	Kaby Lake					
Goldmont		14 nm	Skylake	Coffee Lake	6 cores on mainstream desktop				
Goldmont		14 nm	Skylake	Amber Lake	Mobile-only				
Goldmont Plus		14 nm	Skylake	Whiskey Lake	Mobile-only				
Goldmont Plus		14 nm	Skylake	Coffee Lake Refresh	8 cores on mainstream desktop				
Goldmont Plus		14 nm	Skylake	Comet Lake	10 cores on mainstream desktop				
Goldmont Plus		14 nm	Sunny Cove	Cypress Cove (Rocket Lake)	Backported Sunny Cove microarchitecture for 14 nm				
Tremont		10 nm	Skylake	Palm Cove (Cannon Lake)	Mobile-only				
Tremont		10 nm	Sunny Cove	Sunny Cove (Ice Lake)	512 KB L2-cache/core				
Tremont		10 nm	Sunny Cove	Willow Cove (Tiger Lake)	X^{e} graphics engine				
Gracemont		Intel 7 (10 nm ESF)	Golden Cove	Golden Cove (Alder Lake)	Hybrid, DDR5, PCIe 5.0				
Gracemont		Intel 7 (10 nm ESF)	Golden Cove	Raptor Cove (Raptor Lake)					
Crestmont		Intel 4	Redwood Cove	Meteor Lake	Mobile-only; NPU, chiplet architecture				
Crestmont		Intel 3	Redwood Cove	Arrow Lake-U					
Skymont		TSMC N3B	Lion Cove	Lunar Lake	Low power mobile only (9–30 W)				
Skymont		TSMC N3B	Lion Cove	Arrow Lake					
Darkmont		Intel 18A	Cougar Cove	Panther Lake					
Arctic Wolf		Intel 18A and/or TSMC N2P	Coyote Cove	Nova Lake					
