= LGA 1700 =

2021 Intel CPU socket

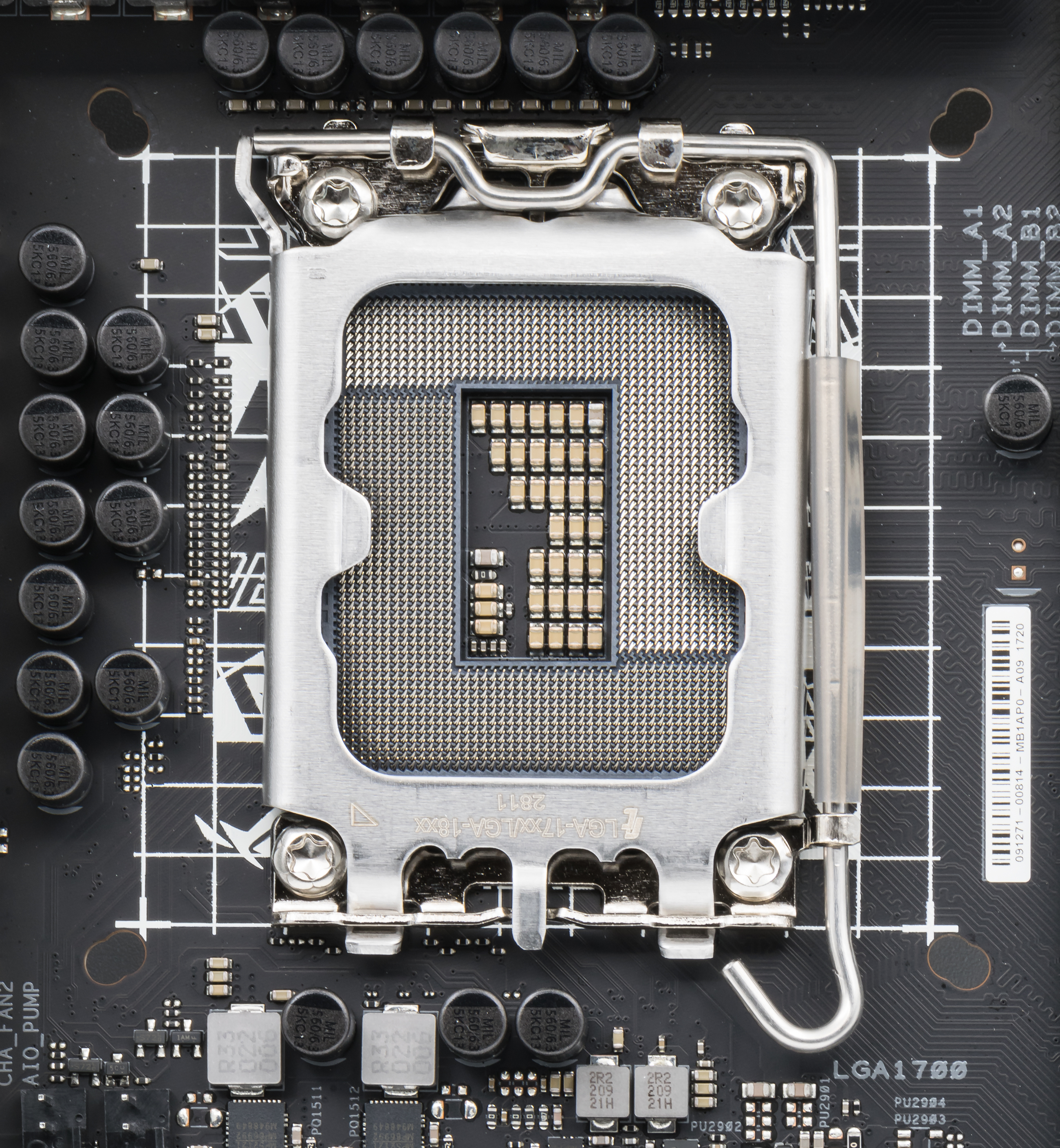
- Release date: November 4, 2021
- Designed by: Intel
- Manufactured by: Lotes
- Type: LGA-ZIF
- Chip form factors: Flip-chip
- Contacts: 1700
- FSB protocol: PCI Express 5.0; Direct Media Interface
- Processor dimensions: 37.5 mm × 45 mm 1,687.5mm^{2}
- Processors: Alder Lake; Raptor Lake
- Predecessor: LGA 1200
- Successor: LGA 1851
- Memory support: DDR4; DDR5
- This article is part of the CPU socket series

LGA 1700 (Socket V) is a zero insertion force flip-chip land grid array (LGA) socket, compatible with Intel desktop processors based on Alder Lake and Raptor Lake, which was first released in November 2021.

LGA 1700 is designed as a replacement for LGA 1200 (known as Socket H5) and it has 1700 protruding pins to make contact with the pads on the processor. Compared to its predecessor, it has 500 more pins, which required a major change in socket and processor sizes; it is 7.5 mm longer. It is the first major change in Intel's LGA desktop CPU socket size since the introduction of LGA 775 in 2004, especially for consumer-grade CPU sockets. The larger size also required a change in the heatsink fastening holes configuration, making previously used cooling solutions incompatible with LGA 1700 motherboards and CPUs.

The LGA 1700 socket and processor package form factor is also used on Zhaoxin's KX-7000 series of desktop processors, though they are electrically and logically incompatible with motherboards designed for Intel processors and vice-versa; the use of the form factor is presumably to ensure broad compatibility with existing cooler solutions and reduce production costs.

== Heatsink design ==
Since the introduction of land grid array (LGA)-based sockets in the consumer hardware space in 2004, the thermal solution hole pattern (the distance between centers of the screw-holes for the heatsink) has changed three times for Intel's mainstream platforms:

- For LGA 775, it is 72 mm × 72 mm
- For LGA 1156, LGA 1155, LGA 1150, LGA 1151 and LGA 1200 it is 75 mm × 75 mm
- For LGA 1700, LGA 1851, it is 78 mm × 78 mm

While some motherboards do offer additional mounting holes for using older coolers, e.g. for using an LGA115x cooler on an LGA1700 motherboard, differences in Z-height and the mounting pressure will result in worse than expected cooling performance. For best results it is recommended to either change the cooling solution to a model certified for this platform or request an updated mounting-kit for one of the higher-end solutions on the market. For heatsinks to be interchangeable, not only the hole pattern, but also the socket seating plane height, the maximum thermal solution center of gravity height from the IHS and the static total compressive minimum need to match.

== Issues ==
Even though some CPU cooler manufacturers are providing adapter kits (usually in the form of different screws) to go with existing LGA115x and LGA1200 retention brackets, there have been reports of the CPU bending or bowing due to uneven mounting pressure from the LGA 1700 integrated loading mechanism (ILM). This leads to the CPU having reduced contact with the cooler plate, which in turn leads to increased temperatures. LGA 1700 contact frames to replace the stock ILM have been released by Thermal Grizzly and Thermalright to ensure even CPU mounting pressure and cooler contact.

== Maximum RAM ==
Initially motherboards based on Alder Lake and Raptor Lake chipsets supported 32 GB memory modules but most known OEMs in 2023 updated their UEFI to support 48 GB modules and in December 2023 support for 64 GB modules started to roll out first by MSI and ASRock. Users are advised to consult with their motherboards web support pages to check what memory modules can be installed.

== Alder Lake chipsets (600 series) ==
			H610	B660	H670	Q670	Z690	W680
Overclocking			No	RAM; BCLK on some ASRock, ASUS and MSI motherboards	RAM only	No	Yes	RAM only
Bus interface			DMI 4.0 ×4		DMI 4.0 ×8			
CPU support			Alder Lake; Raptor Lake (a BIOS update may be required)					
Memory capacity			Up to 64/128 GB (Note: RAM capacity might be limited to the first number before a BIOS update)	Up to 128/256 GB				
Maximum DIMM slots			2	4				
ECC memory			No					UDIMM
Maximum USB 2.0 ports			10	12	14			
USB 3.2 ports configuration	Gen 1x1		Up to 4	Up to 6	Up to 8	Up to 10		
USB 3.2 ports configuration	Gen 2	×1	Up to 2	Up to 4		Up to 8	Up to 10	
USB 3.2 ports configuration	Gen 2	×2	None	Up to 2		Up to 4		
Maximum SATA 3.0 ports			4		8			
Processor PCI Express configuration		5.0	1×16		1×16 or 2×8			
Processor PCI Express configuration		4.0	None	1×4 (M.2)				
PCH PCI Express configuration		4.0	None	6	12			
PCH PCI Express configuration		3.0	8		12		16	
Independent display support (digital ports/pipes)			3	4				
Integrated wireless			suggested: Intel Wi-Fi 6E AX211 (802.11ax / Wi-Fi 6E / Bluetooth 5.3) (Note: Depends on OEM's implementation. OEMs include Wi-Fi chips as optional M.2 CNVio2 boards and can also choose from previous generations, such as the AX201 (Wi-Fi 6 / BT 5.2).)					
PCIe RAID support			No		0, 1, 5			
SATA RAID support			No	0, 1, 5, 10				
Intel Optane memory support			No	Yes				
Intel Smart Sound technology			Yes					
Intel Active Management, Trusted Execution and vPro technology			No			Yes	No	Yes
Chipset TDP			6 W					
Release date			Q1 2022				Q4 2021	Q2 2022

== Raptor Lake chipsets (700 series) ==
			B760	H770	Z790
Overclocking			RAM; BCLK on some ASRock and MSI motherboards, 12th Gen CPUs only. 13th Gen disabled BCLK OC at CPU microcode level	RAM only	Yes
Bus Interface			DMI 4.0 ×4	DMI 4.0 ×8	
CPU support			Alder Lake and Raptor Lake		
Memory capacity			Up to 128/256 GB (Note: RAM capacity might be limited to the first number before a BIOS update)		
Maximum DIMM slots			4		
Maximum USB 2.0 ports			12	14	
USB 3.2 ports configuration	Gen 1x1		Up to 6	Up to 8	Up to 10
USB 3.2 ports configuration	Gen 2	×1	Up to 4		Up to 10
USB 3.2 ports configuration	Gen 2	×2	Up to 2		Up to 5
Maximum SATA 3.0 ports			4	8	
Processor PCI Express configuration		5.0	1x16	1×16 or 2×8	
Processor PCI Express configuration		4.0	1x4		
PCH PCI Express configuration		4.0	10	16	20
PCH PCI Express configuration		3.0	4	8	
Independent display support (digital ports/pipes)			4		
Integrated wireless			Intel Wi-Fi 6E AX211 (802.11ax / Wi-Fi 6E / Bluetooth 5.3) (Note: depends on OEM's implementation)		
PCIe RAID support			No	0, 1, 5	
SATA RAID support			0, 1, 5, 10		
Intel Optane memory support			No		
Intel Smart Sound technology			Yes		
Intel Active Management, Trusted Execution and vPro technology			No		
Chipset TDP			6 W		
Release date			Q1 2023		Q4 2022

== See also ==
- List of Intel microprocessors
- List of Intel chipsets
